

159001–159100 

|-bgcolor=#fefefe
| 159001 ||  || — || September 17, 2004 || Kitt Peak || Spacewatch || NYS || align=right data-sort-value="0.66" | 660 m || 
|-id=002 bgcolor=#fefefe
| 159002 ||  || — || September 18, 2004 || Socorro || LINEAR || V || align=right | 1.0 km || 
|-id=003 bgcolor=#E9E9E9
| 159003 ||  || — || September 22, 2004 || Socorro || LINEAR || XIZ || align=right | 2.0 km || 
|-id=004 bgcolor=#fefefe
| 159004 ||  || — || September 21, 2004 || Socorro || LINEAR || — || align=right | 1.8 km || 
|-id=005 bgcolor=#fefefe
| 159005 ||  || — || September 22, 2004 || Socorro || LINEAR || — || align=right | 1.6 km || 
|-id=006 bgcolor=#fefefe
| 159006 ||  || — || September 22, 2004 || Socorro || LINEAR || — || align=right | 1.6 km || 
|-id=007 bgcolor=#d6d6d6
| 159007 ||  || — || October 4, 2004 || Goodricke-Pigott || R. A. Tucker || — || align=right | 5.2 km || 
|-id=008 bgcolor=#E9E9E9
| 159008 ||  || — || October 4, 2004 || Kitt Peak || Spacewatch || — || align=right | 3.4 km || 
|-id=009 bgcolor=#E9E9E9
| 159009 ||  || — || October 5, 2004 || Haleakala || NEAT || — || align=right | 4.3 km || 
|-id=010 bgcolor=#E9E9E9
| 159010 ||  || — || October 3, 2004 || Goodricke-Pigott || R. A. Tucker || — || align=right | 3.0 km || 
|-id=011 bgcolor=#E9E9E9
| 159011 Radomyshl ||  ||  || October 7, 2004 || Andrushivka || Andrushivka Obs. || GER || align=right | 2.9 km || 
|-id=012 bgcolor=#E9E9E9
| 159012 ||  || — || October 13, 2004 || Goodricke-Pigott || R. A. Tucker || — || align=right | 1.5 km || 
|-id=013 bgcolor=#E9E9E9
| 159013 Kyleturner ||  ||  || October 15, 2004 || Needville || D. Wells || — || align=right | 3.7 km || 
|-id=014 bgcolor=#d6d6d6
| 159014 ||  || — || October 4, 2004 || Kitt Peak || Spacewatch || — || align=right | 3.2 km || 
|-id=015 bgcolor=#E9E9E9
| 159015 ||  || — || October 4, 2004 || Kitt Peak || Spacewatch || AGN || align=right | 1.5 km || 
|-id=016 bgcolor=#d6d6d6
| 159016 ||  || — || October 4, 2004 || Kitt Peak || Spacewatch || KOR || align=right | 1.6 km || 
|-id=017 bgcolor=#d6d6d6
| 159017 ||  || — || October 4, 2004 || Kitt Peak || Spacewatch || EUP || align=right | 5.5 km || 
|-id=018 bgcolor=#E9E9E9
| 159018 ||  || — || October 4, 2004 || Kitt Peak || Spacewatch || WIT || align=right | 1.4 km || 
|-id=019 bgcolor=#d6d6d6
| 159019 ||  || — || October 4, 2004 || Kitt Peak || Spacewatch || — || align=right | 2.6 km || 
|-id=020 bgcolor=#fefefe
| 159020 ||  || — || October 4, 2004 || Kitt Peak || Spacewatch || — || align=right | 1.2 km || 
|-id=021 bgcolor=#d6d6d6
| 159021 ||  || — || October 4, 2004 || Kitt Peak || Spacewatch || — || align=right | 3.9 km || 
|-id=022 bgcolor=#E9E9E9
| 159022 ||  || — || October 4, 2004 || Kitt Peak || Spacewatch || — || align=right | 1.6 km || 
|-id=023 bgcolor=#d6d6d6
| 159023 ||  || — || October 4, 2004 || Kitt Peak || Spacewatch || KAR || align=right | 1.8 km || 
|-id=024 bgcolor=#d6d6d6
| 159024 ||  || — || October 4, 2004 || Kitt Peak || Spacewatch || HYG || align=right | 4.6 km || 
|-id=025 bgcolor=#E9E9E9
| 159025 ||  || — || October 4, 2004 || Kitt Peak || Spacewatch || — || align=right | 2.0 km || 
|-id=026 bgcolor=#d6d6d6
| 159026 ||  || — || October 4, 2004 || Kitt Peak || Spacewatch || — || align=right | 3.2 km || 
|-id=027 bgcolor=#d6d6d6
| 159027 ||  || — || October 4, 2004 || Kitt Peak || Spacewatch || — || align=right | 3.7 km || 
|-id=028 bgcolor=#d6d6d6
| 159028 ||  || — || October 4, 2004 || Kitt Peak || Spacewatch || — || align=right | 3.5 km || 
|-id=029 bgcolor=#E9E9E9
| 159029 ||  || — || October 4, 2004 || Kitt Peak || Spacewatch || MAR || align=right | 2.3 km || 
|-id=030 bgcolor=#E9E9E9
| 159030 ||  || — || October 5, 2004 || Anderson Mesa || LONEOS || HEN || align=right | 2.0 km || 
|-id=031 bgcolor=#fefefe
| 159031 ||  || — || October 5, 2004 || Anderson Mesa || LONEOS || — || align=right | 1.7 km || 
|-id=032 bgcolor=#d6d6d6
| 159032 ||  || — || October 5, 2004 || Anderson Mesa || LONEOS || SAN || align=right | 2.7 km || 
|-id=033 bgcolor=#fefefe
| 159033 ||  || — || October 5, 2004 || Anderson Mesa || LONEOS || — || align=right | 1.7 km || 
|-id=034 bgcolor=#fefefe
| 159034 ||  || — || October 5, 2004 || Anderson Mesa || LONEOS || NYS || align=right | 2.6 km || 
|-id=035 bgcolor=#E9E9E9
| 159035 ||  || — || October 6, 2004 || Kitt Peak || Spacewatch || — || align=right | 1.5 km || 
|-id=036 bgcolor=#d6d6d6
| 159036 ||  || — || October 7, 2004 || Socorro || LINEAR || KOR || align=right | 2.2 km || 
|-id=037 bgcolor=#E9E9E9
| 159037 ||  || — || October 7, 2004 || Anderson Mesa || LONEOS || — || align=right | 3.0 km || 
|-id=038 bgcolor=#E9E9E9
| 159038 ||  || — || October 5, 2004 || Kitt Peak || Spacewatch || HEN || align=right | 1.4 km || 
|-id=039 bgcolor=#d6d6d6
| 159039 ||  || — || October 5, 2004 || Kitt Peak || Spacewatch || THM || align=right | 3.0 km || 
|-id=040 bgcolor=#E9E9E9
| 159040 ||  || — || October 5, 2004 || Kitt Peak || Spacewatch || HEN || align=right | 1.3 km || 
|-id=041 bgcolor=#E9E9E9
| 159041 ||  || — || October 5, 2004 || Kitt Peak || Spacewatch || — || align=right | 1.4 km || 
|-id=042 bgcolor=#E9E9E9
| 159042 ||  || — || October 5, 2004 || Kitt Peak || Spacewatch || AST || align=right | 3.2 km || 
|-id=043 bgcolor=#d6d6d6
| 159043 ||  || — || October 5, 2004 || Kitt Peak || Spacewatch || KAR || align=right | 2.0 km || 
|-id=044 bgcolor=#d6d6d6
| 159044 ||  || — || October 7, 2004 || Kitt Peak || Spacewatch || — || align=right | 3.7 km || 
|-id=045 bgcolor=#d6d6d6
| 159045 ||  || — || October 13, 2004 || Goodricke-Pigott || Goodricke-Pigott Obs. || — || align=right | 5.9 km || 
|-id=046 bgcolor=#E9E9E9
| 159046 ||  || — || October 5, 2004 || Anderson Mesa || LONEOS || — || align=right | 2.7 km || 
|-id=047 bgcolor=#E9E9E9
| 159047 ||  || — || October 6, 2004 || Palomar || NEAT || — || align=right | 3.3 km || 
|-id=048 bgcolor=#fefefe
| 159048 ||  || — || October 7, 2004 || Socorro || LINEAR || — || align=right | 1.1 km || 
|-id=049 bgcolor=#d6d6d6
| 159049 ||  || — || October 7, 2004 || Socorro || LINEAR || EOS || align=right | 3.4 km || 
|-id=050 bgcolor=#E9E9E9
| 159050 ||  || — || October 7, 2004 || Socorro || LINEAR || MRX || align=right | 1.7 km || 
|-id=051 bgcolor=#fefefe
| 159051 ||  || — || October 7, 2004 || Socorro || LINEAR || — || align=right | 1.1 km || 
|-id=052 bgcolor=#E9E9E9
| 159052 ||  || — || October 7, 2004 || Socorro || LINEAR || — || align=right | 1.6 km || 
|-id=053 bgcolor=#E9E9E9
| 159053 ||  || — || October 7, 2004 || Anderson Mesa || LONEOS || RAF || align=right | 2.0 km || 
|-id=054 bgcolor=#d6d6d6
| 159054 ||  || — || October 9, 2004 || Anderson Mesa || LONEOS || — || align=right | 4.6 km || 
|-id=055 bgcolor=#E9E9E9
| 159055 ||  || — || October 4, 2004 || Kitt Peak || Spacewatch || — || align=right | 3.8 km || 
|-id=056 bgcolor=#d6d6d6
| 159056 ||  || — || October 4, 2004 || Kitt Peak || Spacewatch || — || align=right | 4.1 km || 
|-id=057 bgcolor=#d6d6d6
| 159057 ||  || — || October 4, 2004 || Kitt Peak || Spacewatch || — || align=right | 4.1 km || 
|-id=058 bgcolor=#d6d6d6
| 159058 ||  || — || October 4, 2004 || Kitt Peak || Spacewatch || — || align=right | 5.6 km || 
|-id=059 bgcolor=#d6d6d6
| 159059 ||  || — || October 5, 2004 || Kitt Peak || Spacewatch || — || align=right | 3.9 km || 
|-id=060 bgcolor=#d6d6d6
| 159060 ||  || — || October 6, 2004 || Kitt Peak || Spacewatch || — || align=right | 4.0 km || 
|-id=061 bgcolor=#d6d6d6
| 159061 ||  || — || October 6, 2004 || Kitt Peak || Spacewatch || — || align=right | 2.9 km || 
|-id=062 bgcolor=#d6d6d6
| 159062 ||  || — || October 6, 2004 || Kitt Peak || Spacewatch || — || align=right | 3.2 km || 
|-id=063 bgcolor=#E9E9E9
| 159063 ||  || — || October 7, 2004 || Socorro || LINEAR || — || align=right | 3.8 km || 
|-id=064 bgcolor=#E9E9E9
| 159064 ||  || — || October 7, 2004 || Socorro || LINEAR || — || align=right | 3.9 km || 
|-id=065 bgcolor=#d6d6d6
| 159065 ||  || — || October 7, 2004 || Socorro || LINEAR || EOS || align=right | 3.3 km || 
|-id=066 bgcolor=#E9E9E9
| 159066 ||  || — || October 6, 2004 || Kitt Peak || Spacewatch || — || align=right | 3.5 km || 
|-id=067 bgcolor=#fefefe
| 159067 ||  || — || October 7, 2004 || Kitt Peak || Spacewatch || MAS || align=right data-sort-value="0.95" | 950 m || 
|-id=068 bgcolor=#fefefe
| 159068 ||  || — || October 7, 2004 || Kitt Peak || Spacewatch || MAS || align=right | 1.0 km || 
|-id=069 bgcolor=#E9E9E9
| 159069 ||  || — || October 7, 2004 || Kitt Peak || Spacewatch || HEN || align=right | 1.4 km || 
|-id=070 bgcolor=#E9E9E9
| 159070 ||  || — || October 7, 2004 || Kitt Peak || Spacewatch || — || align=right | 3.8 km || 
|-id=071 bgcolor=#E9E9E9
| 159071 ||  || — || October 7, 2004 || Kitt Peak || Spacewatch || — || align=right | 2.8 km || 
|-id=072 bgcolor=#E9E9E9
| 159072 ||  || — || October 7, 2004 || Kitt Peak || Spacewatch || — || align=right | 3.6 km || 
|-id=073 bgcolor=#E9E9E9
| 159073 ||  || — || October 7, 2004 || Kitt Peak || Spacewatch || — || align=right | 4.0 km || 
|-id=074 bgcolor=#E9E9E9
| 159074 ||  || — || October 7, 2004 || Kitt Peak || Spacewatch || — || align=right | 3.0 km || 
|-id=075 bgcolor=#d6d6d6
| 159075 ||  || — || October 7, 2004 || Kitt Peak || Spacewatch || — || align=right | 4.5 km || 
|-id=076 bgcolor=#d6d6d6
| 159076 ||  || — || October 7, 2004 || Kitt Peak || Spacewatch || EOS || align=right | 3.2 km || 
|-id=077 bgcolor=#d6d6d6
| 159077 ||  || — || October 7, 2004 || Kitt Peak || Spacewatch || — || align=right | 4.0 km || 
|-id=078 bgcolor=#d6d6d6
| 159078 ||  || — || October 7, 2004 || Kitt Peak || Spacewatch || — || align=right | 4.6 km || 
|-id=079 bgcolor=#E9E9E9
| 159079 ||  || — || October 8, 2004 || Kitt Peak || Spacewatch || — || align=right | 2.9 km || 
|-id=080 bgcolor=#E9E9E9
| 159080 ||  || — || October 7, 2004 || Socorro || LINEAR || — || align=right | 2.8 km || 
|-id=081 bgcolor=#E9E9E9
| 159081 ||  || — || October 8, 2004 || Kitt Peak || Spacewatch || HOF || align=right | 3.2 km || 
|-id=082 bgcolor=#d6d6d6
| 159082 ||  || — || October 9, 2004 || Socorro || LINEAR || — || align=right | 5.2 km || 
|-id=083 bgcolor=#E9E9E9
| 159083 ||  || — || October 6, 2004 || Socorro || LINEAR || — || align=right | 3.2 km || 
|-id=084 bgcolor=#d6d6d6
| 159084 ||  || — || October 7, 2004 || Palomar || NEAT || — || align=right | 2.8 km || 
|-id=085 bgcolor=#d6d6d6
| 159085 ||  || — || October 9, 2004 || Kitt Peak || Spacewatch || — || align=right | 4.2 km || 
|-id=086 bgcolor=#E9E9E9
| 159086 ||  || — || October 9, 2004 || Kitt Peak || Spacewatch || — || align=right | 3.8 km || 
|-id=087 bgcolor=#E9E9E9
| 159087 ||  || — || October 9, 2004 || Kitt Peak || Spacewatch || — || align=right | 3.8 km || 
|-id=088 bgcolor=#E9E9E9
| 159088 ||  || — || October 12, 2004 || Anderson Mesa || LONEOS || INO || align=right | 2.1 km || 
|-id=089 bgcolor=#E9E9E9
| 159089 ||  || — || October 9, 2004 || Socorro || LINEAR || — || align=right | 3.0 km || 
|-id=090 bgcolor=#d6d6d6
| 159090 ||  || — || October 9, 2004 || Kitt Peak || Spacewatch || — || align=right | 6.1 km || 
|-id=091 bgcolor=#d6d6d6
| 159091 ||  || — || October 10, 2004 || Kitt Peak || Spacewatch || — || align=right | 4.6 km || 
|-id=092 bgcolor=#E9E9E9
| 159092 ||  || — || October 10, 2004 || Kitt Peak || Spacewatch || HEN || align=right | 1.3 km || 
|-id=093 bgcolor=#d6d6d6
| 159093 ||  || — || October 10, 2004 || Kitt Peak || Spacewatch || — || align=right | 4.6 km || 
|-id=094 bgcolor=#E9E9E9
| 159094 ||  || — || October 9, 2004 || Kitt Peak || Spacewatch || — || align=right | 3.2 km || 
|-id=095 bgcolor=#E9E9E9
| 159095 ||  || — || October 11, 2004 || Kitt Peak || Spacewatch || — || align=right | 3.4 km || 
|-id=096 bgcolor=#E9E9E9
| 159096 ||  || — || October 11, 2004 || Kitt Peak || Spacewatch || — || align=right | 2.8 km || 
|-id=097 bgcolor=#d6d6d6
| 159097 ||  || — || October 11, 2004 || Kitt Peak || Spacewatch || THM || align=right | 3.4 km || 
|-id=098 bgcolor=#d6d6d6
| 159098 ||  || — || October 9, 2004 || Kitt Peak || Spacewatch || — || align=right | 4.9 km || 
|-id=099 bgcolor=#d6d6d6
| 159099 ||  || — || October 9, 2004 || Kitt Peak || Spacewatch || KOR || align=right | 2.0 km || 
|-id=100 bgcolor=#d6d6d6
| 159100 ||  || — || October 9, 2004 || Kitt Peak || Spacewatch || EOS || align=right | 3.0 km || 
|}

159101–159200 

|-bgcolor=#E9E9E9
| 159101 ||  || — || October 10, 2004 || Kitt Peak || Spacewatch || — || align=right | 1.6 km || 
|-id=102 bgcolor=#d6d6d6
| 159102 Sarahflanigan ||  ||  || October 11, 2004 || Kitt Peak || M. W. Buie || TEL || align=right | 2.4 km || 
|-id=103 bgcolor=#E9E9E9
| 159103 ||  || — || October 9, 2004 || Socorro || LINEAR || — || align=right | 2.6 km || 
|-id=104 bgcolor=#d6d6d6
| 159104 ||  || — || October 20, 2004 || Socorro || LINEAR || THM || align=right | 3.7 km || 
|-id=105 bgcolor=#d6d6d6
| 159105 ||  || — || October 23, 2004 || Kitt Peak || Spacewatch || — || align=right | 4.1 km || 
|-id=106 bgcolor=#d6d6d6
| 159106 ||  || — || November 3, 2004 || Kitt Peak || Spacewatch || KOR || align=right | 2.4 km || 
|-id=107 bgcolor=#d6d6d6
| 159107 ||  || — || November 3, 2004 || Kitt Peak || Spacewatch || — || align=right | 3.2 km || 
|-id=108 bgcolor=#E9E9E9
| 159108 ||  || — || November 3, 2004 || Anderson Mesa || LONEOS || — || align=right | 2.3 km || 
|-id=109 bgcolor=#E9E9E9
| 159109 ||  || — || November 3, 2004 || Catalina || CSS || — || align=right | 4.1 km || 
|-id=110 bgcolor=#E9E9E9
| 159110 ||  || — || November 5, 2004 || Palomar || NEAT || — || align=right | 2.9 km || 
|-id=111 bgcolor=#FA8072
| 159111 ||  || — || November 5, 2004 || Anderson Mesa || LONEOS || — || align=right | 1.5 km || 
|-id=112 bgcolor=#d6d6d6
| 159112 ||  || — || November 3, 2004 || Palomar || NEAT || EOS || align=right | 3.0 km || 
|-id=113 bgcolor=#d6d6d6
| 159113 ||  || — || November 4, 2004 || Kitt Peak || Spacewatch || KOR || align=right | 1.9 km || 
|-id=114 bgcolor=#d6d6d6
| 159114 ||  || — || November 4, 2004 || Kitt Peak || Spacewatch || — || align=right | 3.1 km || 
|-id=115 bgcolor=#d6d6d6
| 159115 ||  || — || November 4, 2004 || Kitt Peak || Spacewatch || HYG || align=right | 4.0 km || 
|-id=116 bgcolor=#d6d6d6
| 159116 ||  || — || November 4, 2004 || Catalina || CSS || — || align=right | 4.5 km || 
|-id=117 bgcolor=#d6d6d6
| 159117 ||  || — || November 5, 2004 || Campo Imperatore || CINEOS || — || align=right | 3.2 km || 
|-id=118 bgcolor=#d6d6d6
| 159118 ||  || — || November 4, 2004 || Anderson Mesa || LONEOS || VER || align=right | 4.8 km || 
|-id=119 bgcolor=#d6d6d6
| 159119 ||  || — || November 3, 2004 || Kitt Peak || Spacewatch || — || align=right | 3.7 km || 
|-id=120 bgcolor=#d6d6d6
| 159120 ||  || — || November 3, 2004 || Kitt Peak || Spacewatch || — || align=right | 4.8 km || 
|-id=121 bgcolor=#d6d6d6
| 159121 ||  || — || November 4, 2004 || Kitt Peak || Spacewatch || K-2 || align=right | 2.2 km || 
|-id=122 bgcolor=#E9E9E9
| 159122 ||  || — || November 4, 2004 || Kitt Peak || Spacewatch || — || align=right | 2.3 km || 
|-id=123 bgcolor=#d6d6d6
| 159123 ||  || — || November 7, 2004 || Socorro || LINEAR || — || align=right | 4.1 km || 
|-id=124 bgcolor=#d6d6d6
| 159124 ||  || — || November 6, 2004 || Socorro || LINEAR || ALA || align=right | 5.4 km || 
|-id=125 bgcolor=#E9E9E9
| 159125 ||  || — || November 6, 2004 || Socorro || LINEAR || — || align=right | 1.6 km || 
|-id=126 bgcolor=#d6d6d6
| 159126 ||  || — || November 10, 2004 || Kitt Peak || Spacewatch || — || align=right | 6.9 km || 
|-id=127 bgcolor=#d6d6d6
| 159127 ||  || — || November 11, 2004 || Anderson Mesa || LONEOS || — || align=right | 2.9 km || 
|-id=128 bgcolor=#d6d6d6
| 159128 ||  || — || November 12, 2004 || Catalina || CSS || — || align=right | 4.3 km || 
|-id=129 bgcolor=#d6d6d6
| 159129 ||  || — || November 3, 2004 || Palomar || NEAT || KOR || align=right | 2.7 km || 
|-id=130 bgcolor=#d6d6d6
| 159130 ||  || — || November 9, 2004 || Mauna Kea || C. Veillet || — || align=right | 3.3 km || 
|-id=131 bgcolor=#E9E9E9
| 159131 ||  || — || November 17, 2004 || Campo Imperatore || CINEOS || — || align=right | 3.9 km || 
|-id=132 bgcolor=#d6d6d6
| 159132 ||  || — || November 17, 2004 || Campo Imperatore || CINEOS || — || align=right | 5.0 km || 
|-id=133 bgcolor=#E9E9E9
| 159133 ||  || — || November 18, 2004 || Socorro || LINEAR || — || align=right | 3.9 km || 
|-id=134 bgcolor=#d6d6d6
| 159134 ||  || — || December 2, 2004 || Socorro || LINEAR || — || align=right | 2.4 km || 
|-id=135 bgcolor=#d6d6d6
| 159135 ||  || — || December 2, 2004 || Palomar || NEAT || — || align=right | 5.4 km || 
|-id=136 bgcolor=#d6d6d6
| 159136 ||  || — || December 2, 2004 || Catalina || CSS || — || align=right | 6.4 km || 
|-id=137 bgcolor=#E9E9E9
| 159137 ||  || — || December 2, 2004 || Catalina || CSS || — || align=right | 2.2 km || 
|-id=138 bgcolor=#d6d6d6
| 159138 ||  || — || December 3, 2004 || Kitt Peak || Spacewatch || THM || align=right | 4.9 km || 
|-id=139 bgcolor=#E9E9E9
| 159139 ||  || — || December 9, 2004 || Socorro || LINEAR || RAF || align=right | 3.5 km || 
|-id=140 bgcolor=#d6d6d6
| 159140 ||  || — || December 8, 2004 || Socorro || LINEAR || — || align=right | 5.3 km || 
|-id=141 bgcolor=#d6d6d6
| 159141 ||  || — || December 10, 2004 || Campo Imperatore || CINEOS || — || align=right | 4.2 km || 
|-id=142 bgcolor=#d6d6d6
| 159142 ||  || — || December 11, 2004 || Campo Imperatore || CINEOS || THM || align=right | 4.3 km || 
|-id=143 bgcolor=#d6d6d6
| 159143 ||  || — || December 10, 2004 || Socorro || LINEAR || — || align=right | 2.8 km || 
|-id=144 bgcolor=#d6d6d6
| 159144 ||  || — || December 11, 2004 || Kitt Peak || Spacewatch || — || align=right | 3.9 km || 
|-id=145 bgcolor=#d6d6d6
| 159145 ||  || — || December 14, 2004 || Campo Imperatore || CINEOS || — || align=right | 3.8 km || 
|-id=146 bgcolor=#d6d6d6
| 159146 ||  || — || December 7, 2004 || Socorro || LINEAR || — || align=right | 5.0 km || 
|-id=147 bgcolor=#d6d6d6
| 159147 ||  || — || December 10, 2004 || Socorro || LINEAR || — || align=right | 4.4 km || 
|-id=148 bgcolor=#d6d6d6
| 159148 ||  || — || December 10, 2004 || Socorro || LINEAR || — || align=right | 4.1 km || 
|-id=149 bgcolor=#d6d6d6
| 159149 ||  || — || December 10, 2004 || Socorro || LINEAR || KOR || align=right | 2.4 km || 
|-id=150 bgcolor=#d6d6d6
| 159150 ||  || — || December 11, 2004 || Socorro || LINEAR || — || align=right | 4.8 km || 
|-id=151 bgcolor=#E9E9E9
| 159151 ||  || — || December 12, 2004 || Socorro || LINEAR || — || align=right | 2.8 km || 
|-id=152 bgcolor=#d6d6d6
| 159152 ||  || — || December 10, 2004 || Calvin-Rehoboth || L. A. Molnar || — || align=right | 3.9 km || 
|-id=153 bgcolor=#E9E9E9
| 159153 ||  || — || December 15, 2004 || Socorro || LINEAR || — || align=right | 1.9 km || 
|-id=154 bgcolor=#d6d6d6
| 159154 ||  || — || December 15, 2004 || Socorro || LINEAR || EMA || align=right | 6.0 km || 
|-id=155 bgcolor=#d6d6d6
| 159155 ||  || — || December 4, 2004 || Anderson Mesa || LONEOS || — || align=right | 4.4 km || 
|-id=156 bgcolor=#d6d6d6
| 159156 ||  || — || December 2, 2004 || Catalina || CSS || — || align=right | 3.8 km || 
|-id=157 bgcolor=#d6d6d6
| 159157 ||  || — || December 2, 2004 || Catalina || CSS || — || align=right | 3.5 km || 
|-id=158 bgcolor=#d6d6d6
| 159158 ||  || — || December 11, 2004 || Campo Imperatore || CINEOS || HYG || align=right | 4.6 km || 
|-id=159 bgcolor=#E9E9E9
| 159159 ||  || — || December 13, 2004 || Socorro || LINEAR || — || align=right | 4.0 km || 
|-id=160 bgcolor=#E9E9E9
| 159160 ||  || — || December 13, 2004 || Socorro || LINEAR || — || align=right | 2.4 km || 
|-id=161 bgcolor=#d6d6d6
| 159161 ||  || — || December 18, 2004 || Mount Lemmon || Mount Lemmon Survey || TIR || align=right | 7.4 km || 
|-id=162 bgcolor=#C2FFFF
| 159162 ||  || — || January 13, 2005 || Kitt Peak || Spacewatch || L5 || align=right | 13 km || 
|-id=163 bgcolor=#C2FFFF
| 159163 ||  || — || March 9, 2005 || Mount Lemmon || Mount Lemmon Survey || L5 || align=right | 10 km || 
|-id=164 bgcolor=#E9E9E9
| 159164 La Cañada ||  ||  || May 3, 2005 || La Cañada || J. Lacruz || — || align=right | 3.9 km || 
|-id=165 bgcolor=#fefefe
| 159165 ||  || — || August 26, 2005 || Anderson Mesa || LONEOS || H || align=right data-sort-value="0.92" | 920 m || 
|-id=166 bgcolor=#fefefe
| 159166 ||  || — || September 11, 2005 || Anderson Mesa || LONEOS || FLO || align=right | 1.1 km || 
|-id=167 bgcolor=#E9E9E9
| 159167 ||  || — || September 10, 2005 || Kingsnake || J. V. McClusky || MAR || align=right | 1.6 km || 
|-id=168 bgcolor=#fefefe
| 159168 ||  || — || September 23, 2005 || Catalina || CSS || — || align=right | 1.2 km || 
|-id=169 bgcolor=#fefefe
| 159169 ||  || — || September 24, 2005 || Kitt Peak || Spacewatch || NYS || align=right | 1.9 km || 
|-id=170 bgcolor=#fefefe
| 159170 ||  || — || September 26, 2005 || Kitt Peak || Spacewatch || FLO || align=right | 1.2 km || 
|-id=171 bgcolor=#fefefe
| 159171 ||  || — || September 23, 2005 || Kitt Peak || Spacewatch || — || align=right | 1.2 km || 
|-id=172 bgcolor=#fefefe
| 159172 ||  || — || September 25, 2005 || Palomar || NEAT || — || align=right | 1.4 km || 
|-id=173 bgcolor=#fefefe
| 159173 ||  || — || September 29, 2005 || Kitt Peak || Spacewatch || — || align=right | 1.1 km || 
|-id=174 bgcolor=#fefefe
| 159174 ||  || — || September 29, 2005 || Anderson Mesa || LONEOS || — || align=right data-sort-value="0.97" | 970 m || 
|-id=175 bgcolor=#fefefe
| 159175 ||  || — || September 30, 2005 || Socorro || LINEAR || — || align=right | 1.5 km || 
|-id=176 bgcolor=#fefefe
| 159176 ||  || — || September 30, 2005 || Catalina || CSS || H || align=right data-sort-value="0.91" | 910 m || 
|-id=177 bgcolor=#fefefe
| 159177 ||  || — || September 29, 2005 || Palomar || NEAT || — || align=right | 1.3 km || 
|-id=178 bgcolor=#E9E9E9
| 159178 ||  || — || October 1, 2005 || Mount Lemmon || Mount Lemmon Survey || — || align=right | 4.5 km || 
|-id=179 bgcolor=#fefefe
| 159179 ||  || — || October 5, 2005 || Goodricke-Pigott || R. A. Tucker || — || align=right | 1.1 km || 
|-id=180 bgcolor=#fefefe
| 159180 ||  || — || October 11, 2005 || Kitt Peak || Spacewatch || V || align=right data-sort-value="0.98" | 980 m || 
|-id=181 bgcolor=#d6d6d6
| 159181 Berdychiv ||  ||  || October 29, 2005 || Andrushivka || Andrushivka Obs. || — || align=right | 4.3 km || 
|-id=182 bgcolor=#fefefe
| 159182 ||  || — || October 23, 2005 || Catalina || CSS || FLO || align=right | 1.0 km || 
|-id=183 bgcolor=#fefefe
| 159183 ||  || — || October 23, 2005 || Catalina || CSS || — || align=right | 1.3 km || 
|-id=184 bgcolor=#fefefe
| 159184 ||  || — || October 25, 2005 || Kitt Peak || Spacewatch || MAS || align=right data-sort-value="0.98" | 980 m || 
|-id=185 bgcolor=#fefefe
| 159185 ||  || — || October 25, 2005 || Anderson Mesa || LONEOS || — || align=right | 1.0 km || 
|-id=186 bgcolor=#E9E9E9
| 159186 ||  || — || October 25, 2005 || Catalina || CSS || — || align=right | 3.2 km || 
|-id=187 bgcolor=#fefefe
| 159187 ||  || — || October 22, 2005 || Kitt Peak || Spacewatch || — || align=right | 1.1 km || 
|-id=188 bgcolor=#E9E9E9
| 159188 ||  || — || October 24, 2005 || Kitt Peak || Spacewatch || HEN || align=right | 1.7 km || 
|-id=189 bgcolor=#E9E9E9
| 159189 ||  || — || October 24, 2005 || Palomar || NEAT || — || align=right | 2.7 km || 
|-id=190 bgcolor=#fefefe
| 159190 ||  || — || October 25, 2005 || Mount Lemmon || Mount Lemmon Survey || MAS || align=right data-sort-value="0.85" | 850 m || 
|-id=191 bgcolor=#E9E9E9
| 159191 ||  || — || October 26, 2005 || Kitt Peak || Spacewatch || — || align=right | 1.4 km || 
|-id=192 bgcolor=#fefefe
| 159192 ||  || — || October 22, 2005 || Kitt Peak || Spacewatch || — || align=right | 1.2 km || 
|-id=193 bgcolor=#fefefe
| 159193 ||  || — || October 24, 2005 || Kitt Peak || Spacewatch || MAS || align=right | 1.1 km || 
|-id=194 bgcolor=#fefefe
| 159194 ||  || — || October 27, 2005 || Kitt Peak || Spacewatch || NYS || align=right data-sort-value="0.88" | 880 m || 
|-id=195 bgcolor=#fefefe
| 159195 ||  || — || October 25, 2005 || Kitt Peak || Spacewatch || NYS || align=right | 1.0 km || 
|-id=196 bgcolor=#fefefe
| 159196 ||  || — || October 26, 2005 || Kitt Peak || Spacewatch || NYS || align=right data-sort-value="0.91" | 910 m || 
|-id=197 bgcolor=#E9E9E9
| 159197 ||  || — || October 24, 2005 || Kitt Peak || Spacewatch || — || align=right | 5.4 km || 
|-id=198 bgcolor=#E9E9E9
| 159198 ||  || — || October 25, 2005 || Kitt Peak || Spacewatch || — || align=right | 1.3 km || 
|-id=199 bgcolor=#fefefe
| 159199 ||  || — || October 28, 2005 || Mount Lemmon || Mount Lemmon Survey || NYS || align=right data-sort-value="0.79" | 790 m || 
|-id=200 bgcolor=#fefefe
| 159200 ||  || — || October 25, 2005 || Mount Lemmon || Mount Lemmon Survey || — || align=right | 1.1 km || 
|}

159201–159300 

|-bgcolor=#fefefe
| 159201 ||  || — || October 25, 2005 || Mount Lemmon || Mount Lemmon Survey || NYS || align=right | 1.7 km || 
|-id=202 bgcolor=#fefefe
| 159202 ||  || — || October 27, 2005 || Kitt Peak || Spacewatch || MAS || align=right | 1.2 km || 
|-id=203 bgcolor=#fefefe
| 159203 ||  || — || October 30, 2005 || Palomar || NEAT || H || align=right data-sort-value="0.91" | 910 m || 
|-id=204 bgcolor=#fefefe
| 159204 ||  || — || October 29, 2005 || Mount Lemmon || Mount Lemmon Survey || NYS || align=right | 2.2 km || 
|-id=205 bgcolor=#fefefe
| 159205 ||  || — || October 31, 2005 || Mount Lemmon || Mount Lemmon Survey || — || align=right data-sort-value="0.94" | 940 m || 
|-id=206 bgcolor=#d6d6d6
| 159206 ||  || — || October 29, 2005 || Mount Lemmon || Mount Lemmon Survey || KOR || align=right | 2.0 km || 
|-id=207 bgcolor=#fefefe
| 159207 ||  || — || November 4, 2005 || Kitt Peak || Spacewatch || NYS || align=right | 2.0 km || 
|-id=208 bgcolor=#fefefe
| 159208 ||  || — || November 4, 2005 || Kitt Peak || Spacewatch || — || align=right | 1.1 km || 
|-id=209 bgcolor=#fefefe
| 159209 ||  || — || November 1, 2005 || Mount Lemmon || Mount Lemmon Survey || NYS || align=right data-sort-value="0.72" | 720 m || 
|-id=210 bgcolor=#d6d6d6
| 159210 ||  || — || November 21, 2005 || Kitt Peak || Spacewatch || K-2 || align=right | 2.0 km || 
|-id=211 bgcolor=#fefefe
| 159211 ||  || — || November 21, 2005 || Kitt Peak || Spacewatch || — || align=right | 1.1 km || 
|-id=212 bgcolor=#d6d6d6
| 159212 ||  || — || November 21, 2005 || Kitt Peak || Spacewatch || — || align=right | 2.1 km || 
|-id=213 bgcolor=#fefefe
| 159213 ||  || — || November 22, 2005 || Kitt Peak || Spacewatch || MAS || align=right | 1.2 km || 
|-id=214 bgcolor=#fefefe
| 159214 ||  || — || November 25, 2005 || Mount Lemmon || Mount Lemmon Survey || — || align=right | 1.5 km || 
|-id=215 bgcolor=#fefefe
| 159215 Apan ||  ||  || November 30, 2005 || Suno || S. Foglia || — || align=right | 1.1 km || 
|-id=216 bgcolor=#fefefe
| 159216 ||  || — || November 22, 2005 || Catalina || CSS || — || align=right | 1.7 km || 
|-id=217 bgcolor=#fefefe
| 159217 ||  || — || November 25, 2005 || Kitt Peak || Spacewatch || NYS || align=right | 1.0 km || 
|-id=218 bgcolor=#E9E9E9
| 159218 ||  || — || November 25, 2005 || Kitt Peak || Spacewatch || — || align=right | 2.0 km || 
|-id=219 bgcolor=#fefefe
| 159219 ||  || — || November 28, 2005 || Mount Lemmon || Mount Lemmon Survey || MAS || align=right data-sort-value="0.86" | 860 m || 
|-id=220 bgcolor=#E9E9E9
| 159220 ||  || — || November 28, 2005 || Mount Lemmon || Mount Lemmon Survey || AST || align=right | 2.3 km || 
|-id=221 bgcolor=#fefefe
| 159221 ||  || — || November 28, 2005 || Mount Lemmon || Mount Lemmon Survey || FLO || align=right data-sort-value="0.86" | 860 m || 
|-id=222 bgcolor=#fefefe
| 159222 ||  || — || November 29, 2005 || Socorro || LINEAR || — || align=right | 1.2 km || 
|-id=223 bgcolor=#fefefe
| 159223 ||  || — || November 28, 2005 || Socorro || LINEAR || FLO || align=right data-sort-value="0.92" | 920 m || 
|-id=224 bgcolor=#E9E9E9
| 159224 ||  || — || November 29, 2005 || Catalina || CSS || — || align=right | 2.4 km || 
|-id=225 bgcolor=#d6d6d6
| 159225 ||  || — || November 25, 2005 || Catalina || CSS || TIR || align=right | 5.4 km || 
|-id=226 bgcolor=#fefefe
| 159226 ||  || — || November 30, 2005 || Kitt Peak || Spacewatch || — || align=right | 1.8 km || 
|-id=227 bgcolor=#fefefe
| 159227 ||  || — || December 1, 2005 || Mount Lemmon || Mount Lemmon Survey || MAS || align=right | 1.1 km || 
|-id=228 bgcolor=#fefefe
| 159228 ||  || — || December 1, 2005 || Kitami || K. Endate || — || align=right | 1.3 km || 
|-id=229 bgcolor=#fefefe
| 159229 ||  || — || December 2, 2005 || Socorro || LINEAR || FLO || align=right | 1.1 km || 
|-id=230 bgcolor=#E9E9E9
| 159230 ||  || — || December 3, 2005 || Kitt Peak || Spacewatch || MIS || align=right | 2.5 km || 
|-id=231 bgcolor=#fefefe
| 159231 ||  || — || December 3, 2005 || Kitt Peak || Spacewatch || NYS || align=right data-sort-value="0.86" | 860 m || 
|-id=232 bgcolor=#E9E9E9
| 159232 ||  || — || December 6, 2005 || Kitt Peak || Spacewatch || AGN || align=right | 2.0 km || 
|-id=233 bgcolor=#E9E9E9
| 159233 ||  || — || December 7, 2005 || Kitt Peak || Spacewatch || — || align=right | 3.3 km || 
|-id=234 bgcolor=#E9E9E9
| 159234 ||  || — || December 10, 2005 || Kitt Peak || Spacewatch || — || align=right | 1.7 km || 
|-id=235 bgcolor=#fefefe
| 159235 ||  || — || December 23, 2005 || Needville || Needville Obs. || NYS || align=right | 1.1 km || 
|-id=236 bgcolor=#fefefe
| 159236 ||  || — || December 22, 2005 || Kitt Peak || Spacewatch || V || align=right | 1.1 km || 
|-id=237 bgcolor=#d6d6d6
| 159237 ||  || — || December 22, 2005 || Kitt Peak || Spacewatch || — || align=right | 2.5 km || 
|-id=238 bgcolor=#fefefe
| 159238 ||  || — || December 21, 2005 || Catalina || CSS || — || align=right | 2.2 km || 
|-id=239 bgcolor=#E9E9E9
| 159239 ||  || — || December 22, 2005 || Kitt Peak || Spacewatch || — || align=right | 1.7 km || 
|-id=240 bgcolor=#d6d6d6
| 159240 ||  || — || December 24, 2005 || Kitt Peak || Spacewatch || THM || align=right | 3.7 km || 
|-id=241 bgcolor=#fefefe
| 159241 ||  || — || December 21, 2005 || Catalina || CSS || V || align=right | 1.1 km || 
|-id=242 bgcolor=#E9E9E9
| 159242 ||  || — || December 21, 2005 || Catalina || CSS || — || align=right | 1.5 km || 
|-id=243 bgcolor=#E9E9E9
| 159243 ||  || — || December 24, 2005 || Palomar || NEAT || — || align=right | 1.7 km || 
|-id=244 bgcolor=#d6d6d6
| 159244 ||  || — || December 25, 2005 || Kitt Peak || Spacewatch || THM || align=right | 4.4 km || 
|-id=245 bgcolor=#d6d6d6
| 159245 ||  || — || December 22, 2005 || Kitt Peak || Spacewatch || THM || align=right | 3.2 km || 
|-id=246 bgcolor=#E9E9E9
| 159246 ||  || — || December 25, 2005 || Mount Lemmon || Mount Lemmon Survey || — || align=right | 3.7 km || 
|-id=247 bgcolor=#E9E9E9
| 159247 ||  || — || December 26, 2005 || Kitt Peak || Spacewatch || — || align=right | 1.3 km || 
|-id=248 bgcolor=#d6d6d6
| 159248 ||  || — || December 26, 2005 || Mount Lemmon || Mount Lemmon Survey || — || align=right | 3.6 km || 
|-id=249 bgcolor=#fefefe
| 159249 ||  || — || December 26, 2005 || Mount Lemmon || Mount Lemmon Survey || — || align=right | 1.1 km || 
|-id=250 bgcolor=#d6d6d6
| 159250 ||  || — || December 25, 2005 || Kitt Peak || Spacewatch || THM || align=right | 3.0 km || 
|-id=251 bgcolor=#fefefe
| 159251 ||  || — || December 25, 2005 || Kitt Peak || Spacewatch || — || align=right | 1.3 km || 
|-id=252 bgcolor=#E9E9E9
| 159252 ||  || — || December 25, 2005 || Kitt Peak || Spacewatch || GEF || align=right | 2.1 km || 
|-id=253 bgcolor=#E9E9E9
| 159253 ||  || — || December 26, 2005 || Mount Lemmon || Mount Lemmon Survey || — || align=right | 3.0 km || 
|-id=254 bgcolor=#E9E9E9
| 159254 ||  || — || December 26, 2005 || Kitt Peak || Spacewatch || — || align=right | 4.6 km || 
|-id=255 bgcolor=#d6d6d6
| 159255 ||  || — || December 26, 2005 || Kitt Peak || Spacewatch || HYG || align=right | 5.0 km || 
|-id=256 bgcolor=#E9E9E9
| 159256 ||  || — || December 28, 2005 || Mount Lemmon || Mount Lemmon Survey || — || align=right | 2.3 km || 
|-id=257 bgcolor=#d6d6d6
| 159257 ||  || — || December 28, 2005 || Mount Lemmon || Mount Lemmon Survey || — || align=right | 4.6 km || 
|-id=258 bgcolor=#d6d6d6
| 159258 ||  || — || December 28, 2005 || Mount Lemmon || Mount Lemmon Survey || THM || align=right | 4.1 km || 
|-id=259 bgcolor=#fefefe
| 159259 ||  || — || December 26, 2005 || Kitt Peak || Spacewatch || — || align=right | 1.2 km || 
|-id=260 bgcolor=#d6d6d6
| 159260 ||  || — || December 29, 2005 || Socorro || LINEAR || HYG || align=right | 4.2 km || 
|-id=261 bgcolor=#E9E9E9
| 159261 ||  || — || December 30, 2005 || Socorro || LINEAR || — || align=right | 1.8 km || 
|-id=262 bgcolor=#E9E9E9
| 159262 ||  || — || December 22, 2005 || Kitt Peak || Spacewatch || — || align=right | 3.4 km || 
|-id=263 bgcolor=#d6d6d6
| 159263 ||  || — || December 27, 2005 || Kitt Peak || Spacewatch || BRA || align=right | 3.7 km || 
|-id=264 bgcolor=#d6d6d6
| 159264 ||  || — || December 30, 2005 || Kitt Peak || Spacewatch || THM || align=right | 3.0 km || 
|-id=265 bgcolor=#E9E9E9
| 159265 ||  || — || December 30, 2005 || Kitt Peak || Spacewatch || — || align=right | 2.3 km || 
|-id=266 bgcolor=#d6d6d6
| 159266 ||  || — || December 30, 2005 || Kitt Peak || Spacewatch || — || align=right | 3.6 km || 
|-id=267 bgcolor=#fefefe
| 159267 ||  || — || December 25, 2005 || Mount Lemmon || Mount Lemmon Survey || — || align=right | 1.2 km || 
|-id=268 bgcolor=#d6d6d6
| 159268 ||  || — || December 22, 2005 || Kitt Peak || Spacewatch || — || align=right | 3.4 km || 
|-id=269 bgcolor=#E9E9E9
| 159269 ||  || — || December 25, 2005 || Mount Lemmon || Mount Lemmon Survey || — || align=right | 2.6 km || 
|-id=270 bgcolor=#d6d6d6
| 159270 ||  || — || December 22, 2005 || Catalina || CSS || — || align=right | 5.2 km || 
|-id=271 bgcolor=#fefefe
| 159271 ||  || — || December 29, 2005 || Catalina || CSS || — || align=right | 1.4 km || 
|-id=272 bgcolor=#fefefe
| 159272 ||  || — || December 29, 2005 || Catalina || CSS || — || align=right | 1.4 km || 
|-id=273 bgcolor=#E9E9E9
| 159273 ||  || — || December 29, 2005 || Mount Lemmon || Mount Lemmon Survey || — || align=right | 2.3 km || 
|-id=274 bgcolor=#fefefe
| 159274 ||  || — || December 30, 2005 || Kitt Peak || Spacewatch || MAS || align=right | 1.3 km || 
|-id=275 bgcolor=#E9E9E9
| 159275 ||  || — || January 7, 2006 || RAS || A. Lowe || — || align=right | 3.5 km || 
|-id=276 bgcolor=#E9E9E9
| 159276 ||  || — || January 2, 2006 || Catalina || CSS || — || align=right | 1.7 km || 
|-id=277 bgcolor=#d6d6d6
| 159277 ||  || — || January 2, 2006 || Catalina || CSS || — || align=right | 5.0 km || 
|-id=278 bgcolor=#E9E9E9
| 159278 ||  || — || January 5, 2006 || Catalina || CSS || EUN || align=right | 1.8 km || 
|-id=279 bgcolor=#E9E9E9
| 159279 ||  || — || January 5, 2006 || Anderson Mesa || LONEOS || NEM || align=right | 2.4 km || 
|-id=280 bgcolor=#d6d6d6
| 159280 ||  || — || January 5, 2006 || Anderson Mesa || LONEOS || — || align=right | 5.6 km || 
|-id=281 bgcolor=#d6d6d6
| 159281 ||  || — || January 2, 2006 || Catalina || CSS || EOS || align=right | 3.7 km || 
|-id=282 bgcolor=#d6d6d6
| 159282 ||  || — || January 5, 2006 || Socorro || LINEAR || — || align=right | 5.0 km || 
|-id=283 bgcolor=#E9E9E9
| 159283 ||  || — || January 5, 2006 || Kitt Peak || Spacewatch || MRX || align=right | 1.7 km || 
|-id=284 bgcolor=#d6d6d6
| 159284 ||  || — || January 5, 2006 || Catalina || CSS || TIR || align=right | 5.8 km || 
|-id=285 bgcolor=#E9E9E9
| 159285 ||  || — || January 4, 2006 || Kitt Peak || Spacewatch || — || align=right | 3.0 km || 
|-id=286 bgcolor=#d6d6d6
| 159286 ||  || — || January 4, 2006 || Kitt Peak || Spacewatch || — || align=right | 3.6 km || 
|-id=287 bgcolor=#d6d6d6
| 159287 ||  || — || January 7, 2006 || Mount Lemmon || Mount Lemmon Survey || — || align=right | 3.2 km || 
|-id=288 bgcolor=#d6d6d6
| 159288 ||  || — || January 6, 2006 || Kitt Peak || Spacewatch || HYG || align=right | 4.1 km || 
|-id=289 bgcolor=#d6d6d6
| 159289 ||  || — || January 6, 2006 || Kitt Peak || Spacewatch || — || align=right | 2.9 km || 
|-id=290 bgcolor=#E9E9E9
| 159290 ||  || — || January 7, 2006 || Kitt Peak || Spacewatch || — || align=right | 2.0 km || 
|-id=291 bgcolor=#d6d6d6
| 159291 || 2006 BX || — || January 20, 2006 || Socorro || LINEAR || EUP || align=right | 7.9 km || 
|-id=292 bgcolor=#d6d6d6
| 159292 ||  || — || January 20, 2006 || Kitt Peak || Spacewatch || — || align=right | 4.2 km || 
|-id=293 bgcolor=#fefefe
| 159293 ||  || — || January 22, 2006 || Mount Lemmon || Mount Lemmon Survey || — || align=right | 1.3 km || 
|-id=294 bgcolor=#E9E9E9
| 159294 ||  || — || January 20, 2006 || Kitt Peak || Spacewatch || — || align=right | 4.9 km || 
|-id=295 bgcolor=#E9E9E9
| 159295 ||  || — || January 23, 2006 || Catalina || CSS || — || align=right | 2.4 km || 
|-id=296 bgcolor=#d6d6d6
| 159296 ||  || — || January 23, 2006 || Junk Bond || D. Healy || — || align=right | 4.2 km || 
|-id=297 bgcolor=#d6d6d6
| 159297 ||  || — || January 23, 2006 || Mount Lemmon || Mount Lemmon Survey || — || align=right | 6.6 km || 
|-id=298 bgcolor=#d6d6d6
| 159298 ||  || — || January 23, 2006 || Mount Lemmon || Mount Lemmon Survey || EOS || align=right | 3.5 km || 
|-id=299 bgcolor=#E9E9E9
| 159299 ||  || — || January 25, 2006 || Kitt Peak || Spacewatch || HEN || align=right | 3.4 km || 
|-id=300 bgcolor=#d6d6d6
| 159300 ||  || — || January 23, 2006 || Mount Lemmon || Mount Lemmon Survey || KOR || align=right | 1.5 km || 
|}

159301–159400 

|-bgcolor=#d6d6d6
| 159301 ||  || — || January 22, 2006 || Catalina || CSS || EOS || align=right | 3.9 km || 
|-id=302 bgcolor=#d6d6d6
| 159302 ||  || — || January 22, 2006 || Mount Lemmon || Mount Lemmon Survey || KOR || align=right | 2.1 km || 
|-id=303 bgcolor=#E9E9E9
| 159303 ||  || — || January 23, 2006 || Kitt Peak || Spacewatch || — || align=right | 4.0 km || 
|-id=304 bgcolor=#E9E9E9
| 159304 ||  || — || January 23, 2006 || Mount Lemmon || Mount Lemmon Survey || — || align=right | 1.4 km || 
|-id=305 bgcolor=#d6d6d6
| 159305 ||  || — || January 23, 2006 || Kitt Peak || Spacewatch || HYG || align=right | 4.1 km || 
|-id=306 bgcolor=#E9E9E9
| 159306 ||  || — || January 23, 2006 || Kitt Peak || Spacewatch || MRX || align=right | 2.0 km || 
|-id=307 bgcolor=#d6d6d6
| 159307 ||  || — || January 25, 2006 || Kitt Peak || Spacewatch || THM || align=right | 3.4 km || 
|-id=308 bgcolor=#d6d6d6
| 159308 ||  || — || January 25, 2006 || Catalina || CSS || — || align=right | 5.1 km || 
|-id=309 bgcolor=#E9E9E9
| 159309 ||  || — || January 28, 2006 || 7300 Observatory || W. K. Y. Yeung || — || align=right | 2.2 km || 
|-id=310 bgcolor=#E9E9E9
| 159310 ||  || — || January 23, 2006 || Mount Lemmon || Mount Lemmon Survey || — || align=right | 1.5 km || 
|-id=311 bgcolor=#d6d6d6
| 159311 ||  || — || January 23, 2006 || Mount Lemmon || Mount Lemmon Survey || — || align=right | 5.3 km || 
|-id=312 bgcolor=#d6d6d6
| 159312 ||  || — || January 23, 2006 || Catalina || CSS || — || align=right | 4.8 km || 
|-id=313 bgcolor=#E9E9E9
| 159313 ||  || — || January 24, 2006 || Anderson Mesa || LONEOS || — || align=right | 3.7 km || 
|-id=314 bgcolor=#E9E9E9
| 159314 ||  || — || January 25, 2006 || Kitt Peak || Spacewatch || — || align=right | 2.7 km || 
|-id=315 bgcolor=#d6d6d6
| 159315 ||  || — || January 26, 2006 || Mount Lemmon || Mount Lemmon Survey || — || align=right | 4.1 km || 
|-id=316 bgcolor=#d6d6d6
| 159316 ||  || — || January 28, 2006 || Mount Lemmon || Mount Lemmon Survey || HYG || align=right | 4.1 km || 
|-id=317 bgcolor=#d6d6d6
| 159317 ||  || — || January 30, 2006 || Kitt Peak || Spacewatch || — || align=right | 4.1 km || 
|-id=318 bgcolor=#E9E9E9
| 159318 ||  || — || January 31, 2006 || Mount Lemmon || Mount Lemmon Survey || RAF || align=right | 1.5 km || 
|-id=319 bgcolor=#d6d6d6
| 159319 ||  || — || January 30, 2006 || Kitt Peak || Spacewatch || — || align=right | 4.7 km || 
|-id=320 bgcolor=#E9E9E9
| 159320 ||  || — || January 30, 2006 || Kitt Peak || Spacewatch || GEF || align=right | 2.2 km || 
|-id=321 bgcolor=#d6d6d6
| 159321 ||  || — || January 26, 2006 || Catalina || CSS || — || align=right | 5.4 km || 
|-id=322 bgcolor=#d6d6d6
| 159322 ||  || — || January 26, 2006 || Palomar || NEAT || — || align=right | 5.0 km || 
|-id=323 bgcolor=#d6d6d6
| 159323 ||  || — || January 23, 2006 || Mount Lemmon || Mount Lemmon Survey || — || align=right | 3.1 km || 
|-id=324 bgcolor=#d6d6d6
| 159324 ||  || — || February 1, 2006 || Kitt Peak || Spacewatch || THM || align=right | 4.9 km || 
|-id=325 bgcolor=#E9E9E9
| 159325 ||  || — || February 1, 2006 || Kitt Peak || Spacewatch || — || align=right | 3.5 km || 
|-id=326 bgcolor=#d6d6d6
| 159326 ||  || — || February 1, 2006 || Kitt Peak || Spacewatch || — || align=right | 5.1 km || 
|-id=327 bgcolor=#d6d6d6
| 159327 ||  || — || February 2, 2006 || Kitt Peak || Spacewatch || THM || align=right | 2.8 km || 
|-id=328 bgcolor=#E9E9E9
| 159328 ||  || — || February 2, 2006 || Kitt Peak || Spacewatch || — || align=right | 1.7 km || 
|-id=329 bgcolor=#d6d6d6
| 159329 ||  || — || February 3, 2006 || Mount Lemmon || Mount Lemmon Survey || — || align=right | 4.1 km || 
|-id=330 bgcolor=#E9E9E9
| 159330 ||  || — || February 4, 2006 || Kitt Peak || Spacewatch || — || align=right | 2.2 km || 
|-id=331 bgcolor=#d6d6d6
| 159331 ||  || — || February 20, 2006 || Catalina || CSS || — || align=right | 4.7 km || 
|-id=332 bgcolor=#d6d6d6
| 159332 ||  || — || February 20, 2006 || Kitt Peak || Spacewatch || EOS || align=right | 3.4 km || 
|-id=333 bgcolor=#E9E9E9
| 159333 ||  || — || February 20, 2006 || Mount Lemmon || Mount Lemmon Survey || HEN || align=right | 1.6 km || 
|-id=334 bgcolor=#d6d6d6
| 159334 ||  || — || February 23, 2006 || Mount Lemmon || Mount Lemmon Survey || — || align=right | 3.8 km || 
|-id=335 bgcolor=#d6d6d6
| 159335 ||  || — || February 22, 2006 || Anderson Mesa || LONEOS || — || align=right | 6.0 km || 
|-id=336 bgcolor=#d6d6d6
| 159336 ||  || — || February 24, 2006 || Kitt Peak || Spacewatch || — || align=right | 3.8 km || 
|-id=337 bgcolor=#E9E9E9
| 159337 ||  || — || February 27, 2006 || Mount Lemmon || Mount Lemmon Survey || AGN || align=right | 2.1 km || 
|-id=338 bgcolor=#d6d6d6
| 159338 ||  || — || February 26, 2006 || Anderson Mesa || LONEOS || — || align=right | 6.8 km || 
|-id=339 bgcolor=#d6d6d6
| 159339 ||  || — || March 2, 2006 || Kitt Peak || Spacewatch || 3:2 || align=right | 6.2 km || 
|-id=340 bgcolor=#C2FFFF
| 159340 ||  || — || March 2, 2006 || Kitt Peak || Spacewatch || L5 || align=right | 13 km || 
|-id=341 bgcolor=#d6d6d6
| 159341 ||  || — || March 23, 2006 || Mount Lemmon || Mount Lemmon Survey || KOR || align=right | 2.3 km || 
|-id=342 bgcolor=#C2FFFF
| 159342 || 2006 JR || — || May 2, 2006 || Siding Spring || SSS || L5 || align=right | 27 km || 
|-id=343 bgcolor=#d6d6d6
| 159343 ||  || — || August 23, 2006 || Palomar || NEAT || — || align=right | 4.5 km || 
|-id=344 bgcolor=#fefefe
| 159344 ||  || — || August 29, 2006 || Catalina || CSS || — || align=right | 1.5 km || 
|-id=345 bgcolor=#fefefe
| 159345 ||  || — || September 16, 2006 || Palomar || NEAT || MAS || align=right | 1.1 km || 
|-id=346 bgcolor=#d6d6d6
| 159346 ||  || — || September 26, 2006 || Kitt Peak || Spacewatch || — || align=right | 4.9 km || 
|-id=347 bgcolor=#E9E9E9
| 159347 ||  || — || December 10, 2006 || Kitt Peak || Spacewatch || — || align=right | 2.2 km || 
|-id=348 bgcolor=#fefefe
| 159348 ||  || — || February 15, 2007 || Catalina || CSS || FLO || align=right data-sort-value="0.88" | 880 m || 
|-id=349 bgcolor=#E9E9E9
| 159349 ||  || — || February 16, 2007 || Mount Lemmon || Mount Lemmon Survey || JUN || align=right | 1.7 km || 
|-id=350 bgcolor=#E9E9E9
| 159350 ||  || — || February 25, 2007 || Catalina || CSS || — || align=right | 2.3 km || 
|-id=351 bgcolor=#E9E9E9
| 159351 Leonpascal ||  ||  || March 10, 2007 || Marly || P. Kocher || — || align=right | 1.1 km || 
|-id=352 bgcolor=#d6d6d6
| 159352 ||  || — || March 9, 2007 || Kitt Peak || Spacewatch || — || align=right | 3.1 km || 
|-id=353 bgcolor=#d6d6d6
| 159353 ||  || — || March 9, 2007 || Kitt Peak || Spacewatch || — || align=right | 3.4 km || 
|-id=354 bgcolor=#d6d6d6
| 159354 ||  || — || March 11, 2007 || Kitt Peak || Spacewatch || EOS || align=right | 2.6 km || 
|-id=355 bgcolor=#d6d6d6
| 159355 ||  || — || March 11, 2007 || Kitt Peak || Spacewatch || — || align=right | 4.8 km || 
|-id=356 bgcolor=#d6d6d6
| 159356 ||  || — || March 14, 2007 || Mount Lemmon || Mount Lemmon Survey || — || align=right | 3.5 km || 
|-id=357 bgcolor=#d6d6d6
| 159357 ||  || — || March 10, 2007 || Kitt Peak || Spacewatch || — || align=right | 5.0 km || 
|-id=358 bgcolor=#d6d6d6
| 159358 ||  || — || March 20, 2007 || Kitt Peak || Spacewatch || THM || align=right | 3.6 km || 
|-id=359 bgcolor=#d6d6d6
| 159359 ||  || — || March 25, 2007 || Catalina || CSS || — || align=right | 6.8 km || 
|-id=360 bgcolor=#d6d6d6
| 159360 ||  || — || March 30, 2007 || Palomar || NEAT || HYG || align=right | 5.8 km || 
|-id=361 bgcolor=#fefefe
| 159361 ||  || — || April 11, 2007 || Kitt Peak || Spacewatch || MAS || align=right | 1.1 km || 
|-id=362 bgcolor=#E9E9E9
| 159362 ||  || — || April 14, 2007 || Kitt Peak || Spacewatch || — || align=right | 3.3 km || 
|-id=363 bgcolor=#fefefe
| 159363 ||  || — || April 18, 2007 || Kitt Peak || Spacewatch || — || align=right | 1.0 km || 
|-id=364 bgcolor=#E9E9E9
| 159364 || 4854 P-L || — || September 24, 1960 || Palomar || PLS || — || align=right | 1.6 km || 
|-id=365 bgcolor=#d6d6d6
| 159365 || 6752 P-L || — || September 24, 1960 || Palomar || PLS || THM || align=right | 4.7 km || 
|-id=366 bgcolor=#E9E9E9
| 159366 || 3133 T-2 || — || September 30, 1973 || Palomar || PLS || — || align=right | 4.1 km || 
|-id=367 bgcolor=#d6d6d6
| 159367 || 1977 OX || — || July 22, 1977 || Siding Spring || R. H. McNaught || 2:1J || align=right | 4.1 km || 
|-id=368 bgcolor=#FA8072
| 159368 || 1979 QB || — || August 22, 1979 || Palomar || E. F. Helin || — || align=right | 1.2 km || 
|-id=369 bgcolor=#fefefe
| 159369 ||  || — || October 20, 1993 || La Silla || E. W. Elst || V || align=right | 1.2 km || 
|-id=370 bgcolor=#E9E9E9
| 159370 ||  || — || May 1, 1994 || Kitt Peak || Spacewatch || — || align=right | 1.7 km || 
|-id=371 bgcolor=#d6d6d6
| 159371 ||  || — || February 2, 1995 || Kitt Peak || Spacewatch || — || align=right | 4.5 km || 
|-id=372 bgcolor=#E9E9E9
| 159372 ||  || — || December 16, 1995 || Kitt Peak || Spacewatch || WIT || align=right | 1.8 km || 
|-id=373 bgcolor=#fefefe
| 159373 ||  || — || March 22, 1996 || La Silla || E. W. Elst || — || align=right | 1.7 km || 
|-id=374 bgcolor=#fefefe
| 159374 ||  || — || September 6, 1996 || Kitt Peak || Spacewatch || — || align=right | 1.7 km || 
|-id=375 bgcolor=#E9E9E9
| 159375 ||  || — || December 8, 1996 || Xinglong || SCAP || ADE || align=right | 3.9 km || 
|-id=376 bgcolor=#E9E9E9
| 159376 ||  || — || April 15, 1997 || Kitt Peak || Spacewatch || — || align=right | 3.9 km || 
|-id=377 bgcolor=#fefefe
| 159377 ||  || — || October 3, 1997 || Caussols || ODAS || FLO || align=right data-sort-value="0.92" | 920 m || 
|-id=378 bgcolor=#C2FFFF
| 159378 ||  || — || October 4, 1997 || Kitt Peak || Spacewatch || L4 || align=right | 12 km || 
|-id=379 bgcolor=#E9E9E9
| 159379 ||  || — || January 8, 1998 || Caussols || ODAS || — || align=right | 2.8 km || 
|-id=380 bgcolor=#E9E9E9
| 159380 || 1998 CV || — || February 4, 1998 || Kleť || M. Tichý, Z. Moravec || — || align=right | 1.8 km || 
|-id=381 bgcolor=#E9E9E9
| 159381 || 1998 FB || — || March 16, 1998 || Stroncone || Santa Lucia Obs. || — || align=right | 1.9 km || 
|-id=382 bgcolor=#E9E9E9
| 159382 ||  || — || March 31, 1998 || Socorro || LINEAR || — || align=right | 2.9 km || 
|-id=383 bgcolor=#E9E9E9
| 159383 ||  || — || March 28, 1998 || Socorro || LINEAR || — || align=right | 2.8 km || 
|-id=384 bgcolor=#E9E9E9
| 159384 ||  || — || April 23, 1998 || Socorro || LINEAR || EUN || align=right | 2.8 km || 
|-id=385 bgcolor=#E9E9E9
| 159385 ||  || — || May 22, 1998 || Anderson Mesa || LONEOS || — || align=right | 3.5 km || 
|-id=386 bgcolor=#E9E9E9
| 159386 ||  || — || May 28, 1998 || Xinglong || SCAP || — || align=right | 5.1 km || 
|-id=387 bgcolor=#E9E9E9
| 159387 ||  || — || June 19, 1998 || Caussols || ODAS || — || align=right | 4.1 km || 
|-id=388 bgcolor=#E9E9E9
| 159388 ||  || — || July 26, 1998 || La Silla || E. W. Elst || — || align=right | 5.7 km || 
|-id=389 bgcolor=#E9E9E9
| 159389 ||  || — || August 22, 1998 || Haleakala || NEAT || — || align=right | 4.5 km || 
|-id=390 bgcolor=#E9E9E9
| 159390 ||  || — || August 17, 1998 || Socorro || LINEAR || EUN || align=right | 2.6 km || 
|-id=391 bgcolor=#d6d6d6
| 159391 ||  || — || August 26, 1998 || Kitt Peak || Spacewatch || NAE || align=right | 4.8 km || 
|-id=392 bgcolor=#d6d6d6
| 159392 ||  || — || August 17, 1998 || Socorro || LINEAR || — || align=right | 5.4 km || 
|-id=393 bgcolor=#d6d6d6
| 159393 ||  || — || September 16, 1998 || Kitt Peak || Spacewatch || KOR || align=right | 2.2 km || 
|-id=394 bgcolor=#d6d6d6
| 159394 ||  || — || September 21, 1998 || Kitt Peak || Spacewatch || — || align=right | 4.3 km || 
|-id=395 bgcolor=#d6d6d6
| 159395 ||  || — || September 25, 1998 || Kitt Peak || Spacewatch || — || align=right | 3.1 km || 
|-id=396 bgcolor=#E9E9E9
| 159396 ||  || — || September 21, 1998 || Socorro || LINEAR || DOR || align=right | 5.4 km || 
|-id=397 bgcolor=#d6d6d6
| 159397 ||  || — || September 26, 1998 || Socorro || LINEAR || EOS || align=right | 3.8 km || 
|-id=398 bgcolor=#d6d6d6
| 159398 ||  || — || October 12, 1998 || Anderson Mesa || LONEOS || — || align=right | 4.8 km || 
|-id=399 bgcolor=#FFC2E0
| 159399 ||  || — || October 18, 1998 || Socorro || LINEAR || AMO +1km || align=right | 1.7 km || 
|-id=400 bgcolor=#fefefe
| 159400 || 1998 VL || — || November 7, 1998 || Goodricke-Pigott || R. A. Tucker || — || align=right | 1.5 km || 
|}

159401–159500 

|-bgcolor=#E9E9E9
| 159401 ||  || — || November 10, 1998 || Socorro || LINEAR || — || align=right | 7.0 km || 
|-id=402 bgcolor=#FFC2E0
| 159402 ||  || — || January 14, 1999 || Socorro || LINEAR || AMO +1km || align=right | 1.7 km || 
|-id=403 bgcolor=#fefefe
| 159403 ||  || — || February 10, 1999 || Kitt Peak || Spacewatch || — || align=right data-sort-value="0.80" | 800 m || 
|-id=404 bgcolor=#fefefe
| 159404 ||  || — || March 19, 1999 || Socorro || LINEAR || — || align=right | 2.8 km || 
|-id=405 bgcolor=#E9E9E9
| 159405 ||  || — || May 13, 1999 || Socorro || LINEAR || — || align=right | 4.2 km || 
|-id=406 bgcolor=#fefefe
| 159406 || 1999 KO || — || May 16, 1999 || Catalina || CSS || — || align=right | 3.2 km || 
|-id=407 bgcolor=#E9E9E9
| 159407 ||  || — || July 12, 1999 || Socorro || LINEAR || MIT || align=right | 6.3 km || 
|-id=408 bgcolor=#E9E9E9
| 159408 ||  || — || July 12, 1999 || Socorro || LINEAR || ADE || align=right | 5.1 km || 
|-id=409 bgcolor=#E9E9E9
| 159409 Ratte || 1999 OJ ||  || July 16, 1999 || Pises || Pises Obs. || MAR || align=right | 2.1 km || 
|-id=410 bgcolor=#E9E9E9
| 159410 ||  || — || September 9, 1999 || Socorro || LINEAR || JUN || align=right | 5.9 km || 
|-id=411 bgcolor=#E9E9E9
| 159411 ||  || — || September 9, 1999 || Socorro || LINEAR || — || align=right | 4.1 km || 
|-id=412 bgcolor=#E9E9E9
| 159412 ||  || — || September 9, 1999 || Socorro || LINEAR || — || align=right | 2.4 km || 
|-id=413 bgcolor=#E9E9E9
| 159413 ||  || — || September 9, 1999 || Socorro || LINEAR || — || align=right | 4.4 km || 
|-id=414 bgcolor=#FA8072
| 159414 ||  || — || September 9, 1999 || Socorro || LINEAR || — || align=right | 2.9 km || 
|-id=415 bgcolor=#E9E9E9
| 159415 ||  || — || September 9, 1999 || Socorro || LINEAR || — || align=right | 4.0 km || 
|-id=416 bgcolor=#E9E9E9
| 159416 ||  || — || September 8, 1999 || Socorro || LINEAR || JUN || align=right | 2.3 km || 
|-id=417 bgcolor=#E9E9E9
| 159417 ||  || — || September 9, 1999 || Anderson Mesa || LONEOS || — || align=right | 5.8 km || 
|-id=418 bgcolor=#E9E9E9
| 159418 ||  || — || September 8, 1999 || Anderson Mesa || LONEOS || ADE || align=right | 4.2 km || 
|-id=419 bgcolor=#E9E9E9
| 159419 ||  || — || September 30, 1999 || Socorro || LINEAR || EUN || align=right | 2.8 km || 
|-id=420 bgcolor=#E9E9E9
| 159420 ||  || — || September 30, 1999 || Catalina || CSS || MRX || align=right | 1.7 km || 
|-id=421 bgcolor=#E9E9E9
| 159421 ||  || — || October 8, 1999 || San Marcello || L. Tesi, M. Tombelli || — || align=right | 1.7 km || 
|-id=422 bgcolor=#E9E9E9
| 159422 ||  || — || October 3, 1999 || Catalina || CSS || — || align=right | 4.3 km || 
|-id=423 bgcolor=#d6d6d6
| 159423 ||  || — || October 10, 1999 || Kitt Peak || Spacewatch || — || align=right | 3.4 km || 
|-id=424 bgcolor=#E9E9E9
| 159424 ||  || — || October 2, 1999 || Socorro || LINEAR || DOR || align=right | 4.4 km || 
|-id=425 bgcolor=#E9E9E9
| 159425 ||  || — || October 7, 1999 || Socorro || LINEAR || ADE || align=right | 3.7 km || 
|-id=426 bgcolor=#E9E9E9
| 159426 ||  || — || October 3, 1999 || Socorro || LINEAR || MAR || align=right | 2.0 km || 
|-id=427 bgcolor=#E9E9E9
| 159427 ||  || — || October 3, 1999 || Socorro || LINEAR || EUN || align=right | 2.7 km || 
|-id=428 bgcolor=#E9E9E9
| 159428 ||  || — || October 31, 1999 || Oaxaca || J. M. Roe || — || align=right | 4.4 km || 
|-id=429 bgcolor=#E9E9E9
| 159429 ||  || — || October 31, 1999 || Kitt Peak || Spacewatch || AST || align=right | 3.3 km || 
|-id=430 bgcolor=#E9E9E9
| 159430 ||  || — || October 30, 1999 || Catalina || CSS || MRX || align=right | 1.7 km || 
|-id=431 bgcolor=#E9E9E9
| 159431 ||  || — || November 2, 1999 || Kitt Peak || Spacewatch || — || align=right | 1.8 km || 
|-id=432 bgcolor=#E9E9E9
| 159432 ||  || — || November 2, 1999 || Kitt Peak || Spacewatch || — || align=right | 2.4 km || 
|-id=433 bgcolor=#E9E9E9
| 159433 ||  || — || November 9, 1999 || Socorro || LINEAR || — || align=right | 3.7 km || 
|-id=434 bgcolor=#E9E9E9
| 159434 ||  || — || November 9, 1999 || Socorro || LINEAR || — || align=right | 3.7 km || 
|-id=435 bgcolor=#E9E9E9
| 159435 ||  || — || November 6, 1999 || Socorro || LINEAR || — || align=right | 4.2 km || 
|-id=436 bgcolor=#E9E9E9
| 159436 ||  || — || November 6, 1999 || Socorro || LINEAR || — || align=right | 4.2 km || 
|-id=437 bgcolor=#d6d6d6
| 159437 ||  || — || November 11, 1999 || Kitt Peak || Spacewatch || TRE || align=right | 4.4 km || 
|-id=438 bgcolor=#E9E9E9
| 159438 ||  || — || December 4, 1999 || Catalina || CSS || — || align=right | 2.8 km || 
|-id=439 bgcolor=#d6d6d6
| 159439 ||  || — || December 5, 1999 || Socorro || LINEAR || — || align=right | 4.7 km || 
|-id=440 bgcolor=#E9E9E9
| 159440 ||  || — || December 7, 1999 || Socorro || LINEAR || — || align=right | 2.3 km || 
|-id=441 bgcolor=#E9E9E9
| 159441 ||  || — || December 7, 1999 || Socorro || LINEAR || — || align=right | 5.3 km || 
|-id=442 bgcolor=#d6d6d6
| 159442 ||  || — || December 7, 1999 || Socorro || LINEAR || — || align=right | 4.3 km || 
|-id=443 bgcolor=#E9E9E9
| 159443 ||  || — || December 10, 1999 || Socorro || LINEAR || — || align=right | 3.4 km || 
|-id=444 bgcolor=#E9E9E9
| 159444 ||  || — || December 13, 1999 || Socorro || LINEAR || EUN || align=right | 3.6 km || 
|-id=445 bgcolor=#E9E9E9
| 159445 ||  || — || January 3, 2000 || Socorro || LINEAR || JUN || align=right | 2.5 km || 
|-id=446 bgcolor=#d6d6d6
| 159446 ||  || — || January 5, 2000 || Socorro || LINEAR || EOS || align=right | 3.7 km || 
|-id=447 bgcolor=#E9E9E9
| 159447 ||  || — || January 5, 2000 || Socorro || LINEAR || — || align=right | 5.1 km || 
|-id=448 bgcolor=#E9E9E9
| 159448 ||  || — || January 9, 2000 || Socorro || LINEAR || GEF || align=right | 2.5 km || 
|-id=449 bgcolor=#E9E9E9
| 159449 ||  || — || January 10, 2000 || Kitt Peak || Spacewatch || WIT || align=right | 2.3 km || 
|-id=450 bgcolor=#d6d6d6
| 159450 ||  || — || January 30, 2000 || Kitt Peak || Spacewatch || — || align=right | 5.2 km || 
|-id=451 bgcolor=#d6d6d6
| 159451 ||  || — || January 28, 2000 || Kitt Peak || Spacewatch || — || align=right | 4.4 km || 
|-id=452 bgcolor=#d6d6d6
| 159452 ||  || — || January 28, 2000 || Kitt Peak || Spacewatch || — || align=right | 3.8 km || 
|-id=453 bgcolor=#d6d6d6
| 159453 ||  || — || January 28, 2000 || Kitt Peak || Spacewatch || — || align=right | 5.5 km || 
|-id=454 bgcolor=#FFC2E0
| 159454 ||  || — || February 26, 2000 || Socorro || LINEAR || AMO +1km || align=right data-sort-value="0.58" | 580 m || 
|-id=455 bgcolor=#d6d6d6
| 159455 ||  || — || February 29, 2000 || Socorro || LINEAR || LUT || align=right | 6.0 km || 
|-id=456 bgcolor=#fefefe
| 159456 ||  || — || March 11, 2000 || Anderson Mesa || LONEOS || FLO || align=right | 1.3 km || 
|-id=457 bgcolor=#fefefe
| 159457 ||  || — || May 7, 2000 || Socorro || LINEAR || NYS || align=right | 1.0 km || 
|-id=458 bgcolor=#fefefe
| 159458 ||  || — || May 5, 2000 || Socorro || LINEAR || PHO || align=right | 1.3 km || 
|-id=459 bgcolor=#FFC2E0
| 159459 || 2000 KB || — || May 22, 2000 || Anderson Mesa || LONEOS || APO +1km || align=right | 1.8 km || 
|-id=460 bgcolor=#fefefe
| 159460 ||  || — || May 28, 2000 || Anderson Mesa || LONEOS || PHO || align=right | 1.7 km || 
|-id=461 bgcolor=#fefefe
| 159461 || 2000 OR || — || July 23, 2000 || Reedy Creek || J. Broughton || — || align=right | 2.7 km || 
|-id=462 bgcolor=#fefefe
| 159462 ||  || — || July 24, 2000 || Socorro || LINEAR || — || align=right | 1.3 km || 
|-id=463 bgcolor=#FA8072
| 159463 ||  || — || August 2, 2000 || Socorro || LINEAR || — || align=right | 1.7 km || 
|-id=464 bgcolor=#fefefe
| 159464 ||  || — || August 2, 2000 || Socorro || LINEAR || NYS || align=right | 1.0 km || 
|-id=465 bgcolor=#FA8072
| 159465 ||  || — || August 24, 2000 || Socorro || LINEAR || PHO || align=right | 2.4 km || 
|-id=466 bgcolor=#fefefe
| 159466 ||  || — || August 24, 2000 || Socorro || LINEAR || — || align=right | 4.6 km || 
|-id=467 bgcolor=#FFC2E0
| 159467 ||  || — || August 26, 2000 || Socorro || LINEAR || AMO || align=right data-sort-value="0.76" | 760 m || 
|-id=468 bgcolor=#fefefe
| 159468 ||  || — || August 29, 2000 || Socorro || LINEAR || — || align=right | 1.6 km || 
|-id=469 bgcolor=#fefefe
| 159469 ||  || — || August 25, 2000 || Socorro || LINEAR || — || align=right | 2.0 km || 
|-id=470 bgcolor=#fefefe
| 159470 ||  || — || August 25, 2000 || Socorro || LINEAR || — || align=right | 1.6 km || 
|-id=471 bgcolor=#fefefe
| 159471 ||  || — || August 25, 2000 || Socorro || LINEAR || — || align=right | 2.5 km || 
|-id=472 bgcolor=#fefefe
| 159472 ||  || — || August 31, 2000 || Socorro || LINEAR || — || align=right | 1.5 km || 
|-id=473 bgcolor=#fefefe
| 159473 || 2000 RB || — || September 1, 2000 || Socorro || LINEAR || PHO || align=right | 2.1 km || 
|-id=474 bgcolor=#fefefe
| 159474 ||  || — || September 1, 2000 || Socorro || LINEAR || — || align=right | 2.0 km || 
|-id=475 bgcolor=#E9E9E9
| 159475 ||  || — || September 1, 2000 || Socorro || LINEAR || EUN || align=right | 2.3 km || 
|-id=476 bgcolor=#fefefe
| 159476 ||  || — || September 9, 2000 || Socorro || LINEAR || PHO || align=right | 2.5 km || 
|-id=477 bgcolor=#FA8072
| 159477 || 2000 SE || — || September 17, 2000 || Socorro || LINEAR || — || align=right | 1.4 km || 
|-id=478 bgcolor=#fefefe
| 159478 ||  || — || September 23, 2000 || Socorro || LINEAR || — || align=right | 1.9 km || 
|-id=479 bgcolor=#fefefe
| 159479 ||  || — || September 24, 2000 || Socorro || LINEAR || NYS || align=right | 2.1 km || 
|-id=480 bgcolor=#fefefe
| 159480 ||  || — || September 24, 2000 || Socorro || LINEAR || NYS || align=right | 1.1 km || 
|-id=481 bgcolor=#fefefe
| 159481 ||  || — || September 24, 2000 || Socorro || LINEAR || — || align=right | 1.4 km || 
|-id=482 bgcolor=#FA8072
| 159482 ||  || — || September 23, 2000 || Socorro || LINEAR || — || align=right | 2.2 km || 
|-id=483 bgcolor=#E9E9E9
| 159483 ||  || — || September 24, 2000 || Socorro || LINEAR || — || align=right | 2.1 km || 
|-id=484 bgcolor=#E9E9E9
| 159484 ||  || — || September 30, 2000 || Socorro || LINEAR || BAR || align=right | 2.1 km || 
|-id=485 bgcolor=#fefefe
| 159485 ||  || — || September 26, 2000 || Socorro || LINEAR || — || align=right | 1.6 km || 
|-id=486 bgcolor=#fefefe
| 159486 ||  || — || September 24, 2000 || Socorro || LINEAR || — || align=right | 1.4 km || 
|-id=487 bgcolor=#fefefe
| 159487 ||  || — || September 30, 2000 || Socorro || LINEAR || — || align=right | 4.8 km || 
|-id=488 bgcolor=#fefefe
| 159488 ||  || — || September 30, 2000 || Socorro || LINEAR || CIM || align=right | 3.5 km || 
|-id=489 bgcolor=#fefefe
| 159489 ||  || — || September 26, 2000 || Haleakala || NEAT || — || align=right | 1.4 km || 
|-id=490 bgcolor=#FA8072
| 159490 ||  || — || October 3, 2000 || Socorro || LINEAR || — || align=right | 1.8 km || 
|-id=491 bgcolor=#E9E9E9
| 159491 ||  || — || October 4, 2000 || Socorro || LINEAR || HNS || align=right | 4.0 km || 
|-id=492 bgcolor=#fefefe
| 159492 ||  || — || October 1, 2000 || Socorro || LINEAR || ERI || align=right | 3.2 km || 
|-id=493 bgcolor=#FA8072
| 159493 || 2000 UA || — || October 17, 2000 || Socorro || LINEAR || — || align=right | 3.3 km || 
|-id=494 bgcolor=#E9E9E9
| 159494 ||  || — || October 24, 2000 || Socorro || LINEAR || EUN || align=right | 2.8 km || 
|-id=495 bgcolor=#FFC2E0
| 159495 ||  || — || October 30, 2000 || Socorro || LINEAR || AMO +1km || align=right | 1.2 km || 
|-id=496 bgcolor=#E9E9E9
| 159496 ||  || — || October 24, 2000 || Socorro || LINEAR || MAR || align=right | 1.7 km || 
|-id=497 bgcolor=#E9E9E9
| 159497 ||  || — || October 24, 2000 || Socorro || LINEAR || — || align=right | 3.1 km || 
|-id=498 bgcolor=#fefefe
| 159498 ||  || — || October 24, 2000 || Socorro || LINEAR || KLI || align=right | 4.1 km || 
|-id=499 bgcolor=#E9E9E9
| 159499 ||  || — || October 24, 2000 || Socorro || LINEAR || — || align=right | 2.0 km || 
|-id=500 bgcolor=#E9E9E9
| 159500 ||  || — || October 24, 2000 || Socorro || LINEAR || HNS || align=right | 2.1 km || 
|}

159501–159600 

|-bgcolor=#fefefe
| 159501 ||  || — || October 24, 2000 || Socorro || LINEAR || — || align=right | 3.4 km || 
|-id=502 bgcolor=#E9E9E9
| 159502 ||  || — || November 20, 2000 || Socorro || LINEAR || — || align=right | 2.3 km || 
|-id=503 bgcolor=#E9E9E9
| 159503 ||  || — || November 21, 2000 || Socorro || LINEAR || — || align=right | 2.1 km || 
|-id=504 bgcolor=#FFC2E0
| 159504 ||  || — || November 27, 2000 || Socorro || LINEAR || APO +1km || align=right | 2.3 km || 
|-id=505 bgcolor=#E9E9E9
| 159505 ||  || — || November 20, 2000 || Socorro || LINEAR || — || align=right | 1.8 km || 
|-id=506 bgcolor=#fefefe
| 159506 ||  || — || November 20, 2000 || Socorro || LINEAR || — || align=right | 1.9 km || 
|-id=507 bgcolor=#E9E9E9
| 159507 ||  || — || November 29, 2000 || Haleakala || NEAT || — || align=right | 2.7 km || 
|-id=508 bgcolor=#fefefe
| 159508 ||  || — || December 4, 2000 || Socorro || LINEAR || — || align=right | 2.6 km || 
|-id=509 bgcolor=#E9E9E9
| 159509 ||  || — || December 4, 2000 || Socorro || LINEAR || MAR || align=right | 2.9 km || 
|-id=510 bgcolor=#E9E9E9
| 159510 ||  || — || December 5, 2000 || Socorro || LINEAR || — || align=right | 7.7 km || 
|-id=511 bgcolor=#E9E9E9
| 159511 ||  || — || December 30, 2000 || Haleakala || NEAT || — || align=right | 4.2 km || 
|-id=512 bgcolor=#E9E9E9
| 159512 ||  || — || December 30, 2000 || Socorro || LINEAR || — || align=right | 5.6 km || 
|-id=513 bgcolor=#E9E9E9
| 159513 ||  || — || December 30, 2000 || Socorro || LINEAR || — || align=right | 3.9 km || 
|-id=514 bgcolor=#d6d6d6
| 159514 ||  || — || February 3, 2001 || Socorro || LINEAR || — || align=right | 6.1 km || 
|-id=515 bgcolor=#E9E9E9
| 159515 ||  || — || February 19, 2001 || Socorro || LINEAR || — || align=right | 2.6 km || 
|-id=516 bgcolor=#d6d6d6
| 159516 ||  || — || February 22, 2001 || Kitt Peak || Spacewatch || — || align=right | 5.1 km || 
|-id=517 bgcolor=#d6d6d6
| 159517 ||  || — || March 2, 2001 || Anderson Mesa || LONEOS || — || align=right | 5.5 km || 
|-id=518 bgcolor=#FFC2E0
| 159518 ||  || — || March 19, 2001 || Anderson Mesa || LONEOS || AMO +1kmcritical || align=right | 1.8 km || 
|-id=519 bgcolor=#d6d6d6
| 159519 ||  || — || March 19, 2001 || Anderson Mesa || LONEOS || HYG || align=right | 5.4 km || 
|-id=520 bgcolor=#d6d6d6
| 159520 ||  || — || March 19, 2001 || Socorro || LINEAR || — || align=right | 4.8 km || 
|-id=521 bgcolor=#d6d6d6
| 159521 ||  || — || March 19, 2001 || Socorro || LINEAR || — || align=right | 6.0 km || 
|-id=522 bgcolor=#d6d6d6
| 159522 ||  || — || March 19, 2001 || Socorro || LINEAR || — || align=right | 7.4 km || 
|-id=523 bgcolor=#d6d6d6
| 159523 ||  || — || March 23, 2001 || Socorro || LINEAR || EUP || align=right | 6.7 km || 
|-id=524 bgcolor=#d6d6d6
| 159524 ||  || — || March 16, 2001 || Socorro || LINEAR || EOS || align=right | 3.5 km || 
|-id=525 bgcolor=#d6d6d6
| 159525 ||  || — || March 19, 2001 || Socorro || LINEAR || EUP || align=right | 7.0 km || 
|-id=526 bgcolor=#d6d6d6
| 159526 ||  || — || March 26, 2001 || Socorro || LINEAR || HYG || align=right | 5.6 km || 
|-id=527 bgcolor=#d6d6d6
| 159527 ||  || — || March 25, 2001 || Anderson Mesa || LONEOS || — || align=right | 7.5 km || 
|-id=528 bgcolor=#d6d6d6
| 159528 ||  || — || March 31, 2001 || Anderson Mesa || LONEOS || — || align=right | 5.7 km || 
|-id=529 bgcolor=#d6d6d6
| 159529 ||  || — || March 16, 2001 || Socorro || LINEAR || — || align=right | 6.9 km || 
|-id=530 bgcolor=#d6d6d6
| 159530 ||  || — || March 16, 2001 || Socorro || LINEAR || — || align=right | 5.7 km || 
|-id=531 bgcolor=#d6d6d6
| 159531 ||  || — || April 18, 2001 || Socorro || LINEAR || — || align=right | 6.7 km || 
|-id=532 bgcolor=#d6d6d6
| 159532 ||  || — || April 21, 2001 || Socorro || LINEAR || EUP || align=right | 7.5 km || 
|-id=533 bgcolor=#FFC2E0
| 159533 ||  || — || April 25, 2001 || Anderson Mesa || LONEOS || AMO +1km || align=right | 1.1 km || 
|-id=534 bgcolor=#d6d6d6
| 159534 ||  || — || April 16, 2001 || Socorro || LINEAR || — || align=right | 5.3 km || 
|-id=535 bgcolor=#d6d6d6
| 159535 ||  || — || April 25, 2001 || Anderson Mesa || LONEOS || — || align=right | 5.1 km || 
|-id=536 bgcolor=#fefefe
| 159536 ||  || — || July 21, 2001 || Anderson Mesa || LONEOS || — || align=right | 1.7 km || 
|-id=537 bgcolor=#d6d6d6
| 159537 ||  || — || July 19, 2001 || Anderson Mesa || LONEOS || — || align=right | 5.3 km || 
|-id=538 bgcolor=#fefefe
| 159538 ||  || — || July 29, 2001 || Palomar || NEAT || — || align=right | 1.2 km || 
|-id=539 bgcolor=#d6d6d6
| 159539 ||  || — || August 5, 2001 || Palomar || NEAT || EUP || align=right | 9.4 km || 
|-id=540 bgcolor=#fefefe
| 159540 ||  || — || August 16, 2001 || Socorro || LINEAR || — || align=right | 1.7 km || 
|-id=541 bgcolor=#fefefe
| 159541 ||  || — || August 24, 2001 || Socorro || LINEAR || FLO || align=right | 2.6 km || 
|-id=542 bgcolor=#FA8072
| 159542 ||  || — || August 24, 2001 || Socorro || LINEAR || — || align=right | 1.1 km || 
|-id=543 bgcolor=#fefefe
| 159543 ||  || — || September 11, 2001 || Desert Eagle || W. K. Y. Yeung || FLO || align=right data-sort-value="0.92" | 920 m || 
|-id=544 bgcolor=#fefefe
| 159544 ||  || — || September 10, 2001 || Socorro || LINEAR || FLO || align=right | 1.4 km || 
|-id=545 bgcolor=#fefefe
| 159545 ||  || — || September 12, 2001 || Socorro || LINEAR || — || align=right data-sort-value="0.89" | 890 m || 
|-id=546 bgcolor=#fefefe
| 159546 ||  || — || September 16, 2001 || Socorro || LINEAR || — || align=right data-sort-value="0.87" | 870 m || 
|-id=547 bgcolor=#fefefe
| 159547 ||  || — || September 17, 2001 || Socorro || LINEAR || — || align=right | 1.0 km || 
|-id=548 bgcolor=#fefefe
| 159548 ||  || — || September 17, 2001 || Socorro || LINEAR || — || align=right data-sort-value="0.99" | 990 m || 
|-id=549 bgcolor=#fefefe
| 159549 ||  || — || September 20, 2001 || Socorro || LINEAR || V || align=right data-sort-value="0.93" | 930 m || 
|-id=550 bgcolor=#d6d6d6
| 159550 ||  || — || September 16, 2001 || Socorro || LINEAR || 3:2 || align=right | 7.9 km || 
|-id=551 bgcolor=#fefefe
| 159551 ||  || — || September 16, 2001 || Socorro || LINEAR || — || align=right | 1.2 km || 
|-id=552 bgcolor=#fefefe
| 159552 ||  || — || September 19, 2001 || Socorro || LINEAR || — || align=right | 1.0 km || 
|-id=553 bgcolor=#fefefe
| 159553 ||  || — || September 19, 2001 || Socorro || LINEAR || — || align=right | 2.7 km || 
|-id=554 bgcolor=#d6d6d6
| 159554 ||  || — || September 20, 2001 || Socorro || LINEAR || 3:2 || align=right | 6.8 km || 
|-id=555 bgcolor=#FFC2E0
| 159555 ||  || — || September 27, 2001 || Socorro || LINEAR || AMO || align=right data-sort-value="0.72" | 720 m || 
|-id=556 bgcolor=#fefefe
| 159556 ||  || — || September 20, 2001 || Socorro || LINEAR || — || align=right | 1.2 km || 
|-id=557 bgcolor=#fefefe
| 159557 ||  || — || October 10, 2001 || Palomar || NEAT || V || align=right | 1.1 km || 
|-id=558 bgcolor=#fefefe
| 159558 ||  || — || October 13, 2001 || Socorro || LINEAR || — || align=right | 1.3 km || 
|-id=559 bgcolor=#fefefe
| 159559 ||  || — || October 13, 2001 || Socorro || LINEAR || — || align=right | 1.2 km || 
|-id=560 bgcolor=#FFC2E0
| 159560 ||  || — || October 14, 2001 || Socorro || LINEAR || AMO +1km || align=right | 1.2 km || 
|-id=561 bgcolor=#fefefe
| 159561 ||  || — || October 14, 2001 || Socorro || LINEAR || V || align=right | 1.2 km || 
|-id=562 bgcolor=#fefefe
| 159562 ||  || — || October 10, 2001 || Palomar || NEAT || V || align=right data-sort-value="0.85" | 850 m || 
|-id=563 bgcolor=#fefefe
| 159563 ||  || — || October 11, 2001 || Socorro || LINEAR || — || align=right | 1.5 km || 
|-id=564 bgcolor=#fefefe
| 159564 ||  || — || October 16, 2001 || Palomar || NEAT || V || align=right | 1.4 km || 
|-id=565 bgcolor=#fefefe
| 159565 ||  || — || October 17, 2001 || Socorro || LINEAR || — || align=right | 2.5 km || 
|-id=566 bgcolor=#fefefe
| 159566 ||  || — || October 16, 2001 || Socorro || LINEAR || V || align=right data-sort-value="0.96" | 960 m || 
|-id=567 bgcolor=#fefefe
| 159567 ||  || — || October 18, 2001 || Socorro || LINEAR || — || align=right | 1.8 km || 
|-id=568 bgcolor=#fefefe
| 159568 ||  || — || October 20, 2001 || Socorro || LINEAR || V || align=right | 1.1 km || 
|-id=569 bgcolor=#fefefe
| 159569 ||  || — || October 23, 2001 || Socorro || LINEAR || Vfast? || align=right | 1.2 km || 
|-id=570 bgcolor=#fefefe
| 159570 ||  || — || October 18, 2001 || Palomar || NEAT || — || align=right | 1.3 km || 
|-id=571 bgcolor=#FA8072
| 159571 ||  || — || November 9, 2001 || Socorro || LINEAR || — || align=right | 1.2 km || 
|-id=572 bgcolor=#fefefe
| 159572 ||  || — || November 10, 2001 || Socorro || LINEAR || FLO || align=right | 1.1 km || 
|-id=573 bgcolor=#fefefe
| 159573 ||  || — || November 9, 2001 || Socorro || LINEAR || — || align=right | 1.4 km || 
|-id=574 bgcolor=#fefefe
| 159574 ||  || — || November 9, 2001 || Socorro || LINEAR || FLO || align=right | 1.0 km || 
|-id=575 bgcolor=#fefefe
| 159575 ||  || — || November 9, 2001 || Socorro || LINEAR || — || align=right | 1.5 km || 
|-id=576 bgcolor=#fefefe
| 159576 ||  || — || November 9, 2001 || Socorro || LINEAR || — || align=right | 1.4 km || 
|-id=577 bgcolor=#fefefe
| 159577 ||  || — || November 10, 2001 || Socorro || LINEAR || — || align=right | 1.4 km || 
|-id=578 bgcolor=#fefefe
| 159578 ||  || — || November 12, 2001 || Kitt Peak || Spacewatch || — || align=right | 1.2 km || 
|-id=579 bgcolor=#E9E9E9
| 159579 ||  || — || November 13, 2001 || Haleakala || NEAT || — || align=right | 2.6 km || 
|-id=580 bgcolor=#fefefe
| 159580 ||  || — || November 12, 2001 || Socorro || LINEAR || V || align=right | 1.1 km || 
|-id=581 bgcolor=#fefefe
| 159581 || 2001 WO || — || November 16, 2001 || Kitt Peak || Spacewatch || — || align=right | 3.0 km || 
|-id=582 bgcolor=#E9E9E9
| 159582 ||  || — || December 11, 2001 || Socorro || LINEAR || — || align=right | 2.1 km || 
|-id=583 bgcolor=#fefefe
| 159583 ||  || — || December 10, 2001 || Socorro || LINEAR || — || align=right | 1.5 km || 
|-id=584 bgcolor=#fefefe
| 159584 ||  || — || December 10, 2001 || Socorro || LINEAR || — || align=right | 1.5 km || 
|-id=585 bgcolor=#fefefe
| 159585 ||  || — || December 10, 2001 || Socorro || LINEAR || — || align=right | 1.9 km || 
|-id=586 bgcolor=#fefefe
| 159586 ||  || — || December 10, 2001 || Socorro || LINEAR || — || align=right | 2.0 km || 
|-id=587 bgcolor=#fefefe
| 159587 ||  || — || December 11, 2001 || Socorro || LINEAR || — || align=right | 1.6 km || 
|-id=588 bgcolor=#fefefe
| 159588 ||  || — || December 10, 2001 || Socorro || LINEAR || NYS || align=right | 1.4 km || 
|-id=589 bgcolor=#fefefe
| 159589 ||  || — || December 13, 2001 || Socorro || LINEAR || FLO || align=right | 1.7 km || 
|-id=590 bgcolor=#fefefe
| 159590 ||  || — || December 14, 2001 || Socorro || LINEAR || — || align=right | 1.4 km || 
|-id=591 bgcolor=#fefefe
| 159591 ||  || — || December 14, 2001 || Socorro || LINEAR || — || align=right | 1.5 km || 
|-id=592 bgcolor=#fefefe
| 159592 ||  || — || December 14, 2001 || Socorro || LINEAR || — || align=right | 1.5 km || 
|-id=593 bgcolor=#fefefe
| 159593 ||  || — || December 14, 2001 || Socorro || LINEAR || MASfast? || align=right | 1.2 km || 
|-id=594 bgcolor=#E9E9E9
| 159594 ||  || — || December 14, 2001 || Socorro || LINEAR || — || align=right | 2.1 km || 
|-id=595 bgcolor=#E9E9E9
| 159595 ||  || — || December 11, 2001 || Socorro || LINEAR || — || align=right | 1.5 km || 
|-id=596 bgcolor=#fefefe
| 159596 ||  || — || December 11, 2001 || Socorro || LINEAR || FLO || align=right | 1.2 km || 
|-id=597 bgcolor=#fefefe
| 159597 ||  || — || December 14, 2001 || Socorro || LINEAR || NYS || align=right | 1.1 km || 
|-id=598 bgcolor=#fefefe
| 159598 ||  || — || December 15, 2001 || Socorro || LINEAR || — || align=right | 2.3 km || 
|-id=599 bgcolor=#fefefe
| 159599 ||  || — || December 15, 2001 || Socorro || LINEAR || — || align=right | 2.1 km || 
|-id=600 bgcolor=#E9E9E9
| 159600 ||  || — || December 14, 2001 || Socorro || LINEAR || — || align=right | 3.1 km || 
|}

159601–159700 

|-bgcolor=#fefefe
| 159601 ||  || — || December 17, 2001 || Socorro || LINEAR || — || align=right | 1.8 km || 
|-id=602 bgcolor=#fefefe
| 159602 ||  || — || December 17, 2001 || Socorro || LINEAR || MAS || align=right | 1.6 km || 
|-id=603 bgcolor=#fefefe
| 159603 ||  || — || December 17, 2001 || Socorro || LINEAR || — || align=right | 1.1 km || 
|-id=604 bgcolor=#fefefe
| 159604 ||  || — || December 18, 2001 || Socorro || LINEAR || V || align=right | 1.0 km || 
|-id=605 bgcolor=#fefefe
| 159605 ||  || — || December 17, 2001 || Socorro || LINEAR || — || align=right | 1.1 km || 
|-id=606 bgcolor=#fefefe
| 159606 ||  || — || December 17, 2001 || Socorro || LINEAR || — || align=right | 2.0 km || 
|-id=607 bgcolor=#fefefe
| 159607 ||  || — || December 17, 2001 || Socorro || LINEAR || FLO || align=right | 1.6 km || 
|-id=608 bgcolor=#FFC2E0
| 159608 ||  || — || January 6, 2002 || Socorro || LINEAR || AMO +1km || align=right | 1.7 km || 
|-id=609 bgcolor=#FFC2E0
| 159609 ||  || — || January 8, 2002 || Palomar || NEAT || AMO +1km || align=right | 1.3 km || 
|-id=610 bgcolor=#E9E9E9
| 159610 ||  || — || January 12, 2002 || Ametlla de Mar || J. Nomen || — || align=right | 4.5 km || 
|-id=611 bgcolor=#E9E9E9
| 159611 ||  || — || January 4, 2002 || Haleakala || NEAT || — || align=right | 5.6 km || 
|-id=612 bgcolor=#FA8072
| 159612 ||  || — || January 9, 2002 || Socorro || LINEAR || — || align=right | 1.6 km || 
|-id=613 bgcolor=#E9E9E9
| 159613 ||  || — || January 13, 2002 || Oizumi || T. Kobayashi || GER || align=right | 3.8 km || 
|-id=614 bgcolor=#fefefe
| 159614 ||  || — || January 9, 2002 || Socorro || LINEAR || — || align=right | 2.3 km || 
|-id=615 bgcolor=#E9E9E9
| 159615 ||  || — || January 9, 2002 || Socorro || LINEAR || — || align=right | 1.7 km || 
|-id=616 bgcolor=#fefefe
| 159616 ||  || — || January 8, 2002 || Socorro || LINEAR || — || align=right | 1.3 km || 
|-id=617 bgcolor=#fefefe
| 159617 ||  || — || January 8, 2002 || Socorro || LINEAR || NYS || align=right | 1.3 km || 
|-id=618 bgcolor=#fefefe
| 159618 ||  || — || January 9, 2002 || Socorro || LINEAR || V || align=right | 1.4 km || 
|-id=619 bgcolor=#E9E9E9
| 159619 ||  || — || January 9, 2002 || Socorro || LINEAR || — || align=right | 1.7 km || 
|-id=620 bgcolor=#fefefe
| 159620 ||  || — || January 9, 2002 || Socorro || LINEAR || — || align=right | 1.8 km || 
|-id=621 bgcolor=#E9E9E9
| 159621 ||  || — || January 14, 2002 || Desert Eagle || W. K. Y. Yeung || BRU || align=right | 2.9 km || 
|-id=622 bgcolor=#fefefe
| 159622 ||  || — || January 9, 2002 || Socorro || LINEAR || — || align=right | 1.7 km || 
|-id=623 bgcolor=#E9E9E9
| 159623 ||  || — || January 14, 2002 || Socorro || LINEAR || — || align=right | 2.7 km || 
|-id=624 bgcolor=#fefefe
| 159624 ||  || — || January 14, 2002 || Socorro || LINEAR || — || align=right | 3.4 km || 
|-id=625 bgcolor=#E9E9E9
| 159625 ||  || — || January 6, 2002 || Anderson Mesa || LONEOS || — || align=right | 2.9 km || 
|-id=626 bgcolor=#E9E9E9
| 159626 ||  || — || January 19, 2002 || Socorro || LINEAR || — || align=right | 2.2 km || 
|-id=627 bgcolor=#E9E9E9
| 159627 ||  || — || January 20, 2002 || Anderson Mesa || LONEOS || — || align=right | 1.9 km || 
|-id=628 bgcolor=#E9E9E9
| 159628 ||  || — || January 21, 2002 || Anderson Mesa || LONEOS || — || align=right | 3.0 km || 
|-id=629 bgcolor=#fefefe
| 159629 Brunszvik ||  ||  || January 16, 2002 || Piszkéstető || K. Sárneczky, Z. Heiner || — || align=right | 1.3 km || 
|-id=630 bgcolor=#E9E9E9
| 159630 ||  || — || February 4, 2002 || Palomar || NEAT || — || align=right | 2.7 km || 
|-id=631 bgcolor=#E9E9E9
| 159631 ||  || — || February 8, 2002 || Fountain Hills || C. W. Juels, P. R. Holvorcem || POS || align=right | 5.9 km || 
|-id=632 bgcolor=#E9E9E9
| 159632 ||  || — || February 6, 2002 || Socorro || LINEAR || — || align=right | 1.6 km || 
|-id=633 bgcolor=#C2FFFF
| 159633 ||  || — || February 5, 2002 || Palomar || NEAT || L4 || align=right | 17 km || 
|-id=634 bgcolor=#E9E9E9
| 159634 ||  || — || February 6, 2002 || Socorro || LINEAR || — || align=right | 3.2 km || 
|-id=635 bgcolor=#FFC2E0
| 159635 ||  || — || February 11, 2002 || Haleakala || NEAT || AMO +1km || align=right data-sort-value="0.91" | 910 m || 
|-id=636 bgcolor=#E9E9E9
| 159636 ||  || — || February 3, 2002 || Haleakala || NEAT || EUN || align=right | 2.5 km || 
|-id=637 bgcolor=#fefefe
| 159637 ||  || — || February 7, 2002 || Socorro || LINEAR || NYS || align=right | 3.1 km || 
|-id=638 bgcolor=#E9E9E9
| 159638 ||  || — || February 7, 2002 || Socorro || LINEAR || — || align=right | 3.3 km || 
|-id=639 bgcolor=#E9E9E9
| 159639 ||  || — || February 7, 2002 || Socorro || LINEAR || MAR || align=right | 1.4 km || 
|-id=640 bgcolor=#E9E9E9
| 159640 ||  || — || February 7, 2002 || Socorro || LINEAR || — || align=right | 1.9 km || 
|-id=641 bgcolor=#E9E9E9
| 159641 ||  || — || February 7, 2002 || Socorro || LINEAR || MAR || align=right | 1.8 km || 
|-id=642 bgcolor=#E9E9E9
| 159642 ||  || — || February 7, 2002 || Socorro || LINEAR || AER || align=right | 3.3 km || 
|-id=643 bgcolor=#E9E9E9
| 159643 ||  || — || February 7, 2002 || Socorro || LINEAR || — || align=right | 4.6 km || 
|-id=644 bgcolor=#fefefe
| 159644 ||  || — || February 8, 2002 || Socorro || LINEAR || ERI || align=right | 4.3 km || 
|-id=645 bgcolor=#E9E9E9
| 159645 ||  || — || February 8, 2002 || Socorro || LINEAR || — || align=right | 3.1 km || 
|-id=646 bgcolor=#E9E9E9
| 159646 ||  || — || February 10, 2002 || Socorro || LINEAR || — || align=right | 1.6 km || 
|-id=647 bgcolor=#E9E9E9
| 159647 ||  || — || February 10, 2002 || Socorro || LINEAR || — || align=right | 1.4 km || 
|-id=648 bgcolor=#E9E9E9
| 159648 ||  || — || February 10, 2002 || Socorro || LINEAR || — || align=right | 2.0 km || 
|-id=649 bgcolor=#E9E9E9
| 159649 ||  || — || February 15, 2002 || Haleakala || NEAT || RAF || align=right | 1.6 km || 
|-id=650 bgcolor=#E9E9E9
| 159650 ||  || — || February 6, 2002 || Palomar || NEAT || — || align=right | 1.4 km || 
|-id=651 bgcolor=#fefefe
| 159651 ||  || — || February 7, 2002 || Socorro || LINEAR || — || align=right | 2.7 km || 
|-id=652 bgcolor=#E9E9E9
| 159652 ||  || — || February 10, 2002 || Socorro || LINEAR || — || align=right | 1.6 km || 
|-id=653 bgcolor=#E9E9E9
| 159653 ||  || — || February 11, 2002 || Socorro || LINEAR || — || align=right | 2.8 km || 
|-id=654 bgcolor=#E9E9E9
| 159654 ||  || — || February 16, 2002 || Haleakala || NEAT || — || align=right | 2.8 km || 
|-id=655 bgcolor=#E9E9E9
| 159655 ||  || — || February 21, 2002 || Kvistaberg || UDAS || GEF || align=right | 2.2 km || 
|-id=656 bgcolor=#E9E9E9
| 159656 ||  || — || March 9, 2002 || Socorro || LINEAR || — || align=right | 2.6 km || 
|-id=657 bgcolor=#E9E9E9
| 159657 ||  || — || March 11, 2002 || Haleakala || NEAT || — || align=right | 4.1 km || 
|-id=658 bgcolor=#C2FFFF
| 159658 ||  || — || March 13, 2002 || Socorro || LINEAR || L4 || align=right | 16 km || 
|-id=659 bgcolor=#E9E9E9
| 159659 ||  || — || March 9, 2002 || Socorro || LINEAR || — || align=right | 2.0 km || 
|-id=660 bgcolor=#E9E9E9
| 159660 ||  || — || March 12, 2002 || Socorro || LINEAR || — || align=right | 3.9 km || 
|-id=661 bgcolor=#E9E9E9
| 159661 ||  || — || March 5, 2002 || Anderson Mesa || LONEOS || — || align=right | 2.2 km || 
|-id=662 bgcolor=#fefefe
| 159662 ||  || — || March 12, 2002 || Palomar || NEAT || MAS || align=right | 1.8 km || 
|-id=663 bgcolor=#E9E9E9
| 159663 ||  || — || March 13, 2002 || Palomar || NEAT || — || align=right | 2.1 km || 
|-id=664 bgcolor=#E9E9E9
| 159664 ||  || — || March 12, 2002 || Palomar || NEAT || — || align=right | 2.1 km || 
|-id=665 bgcolor=#E9E9E9
| 159665 ||  || — || March 21, 2002 || Socorro || LINEAR || BAR || align=right | 2.2 km || 
|-id=666 bgcolor=#fefefe
| 159666 ||  || — || April 15, 2002 || Socorro || LINEAR || V || align=right | 1.9 km || 
|-id=667 bgcolor=#E9E9E9
| 159667 ||  || — || April 15, 2002 || Socorro || LINEAR || — || align=right | 2.9 km || 
|-id=668 bgcolor=#E9E9E9
| 159668 ||  || — || April 14, 2002 || Socorro || LINEAR || — || align=right | 4.1 km || 
|-id=669 bgcolor=#E9E9E9
| 159669 ||  || — || April 9, 2002 || Anderson Mesa || LONEOS || HOF || align=right | 5.2 km || 
|-id=670 bgcolor=#E9E9E9
| 159670 ||  || — || April 10, 2002 || Socorro || LINEAR || GEF || align=right | 2.6 km || 
|-id=671 bgcolor=#E9E9E9
| 159671 ||  || — || April 9, 2002 || Socorro || LINEAR || HOF || align=right | 4.4 km || 
|-id=672 bgcolor=#E9E9E9
| 159672 ||  || — || April 9, 2002 || Socorro || LINEAR || — || align=right | 4.7 km || 
|-id=673 bgcolor=#E9E9E9
| 159673 ||  || — || April 12, 2002 || Socorro || LINEAR || — || align=right | 1.9 km || 
|-id=674 bgcolor=#E9E9E9
| 159674 ||  || — || April 12, 2002 || Palomar || NEAT || GEF || align=right | 2.4 km || 
|-id=675 bgcolor=#E9E9E9
| 159675 ||  || — || April 14, 2002 || Palomar || NEAT || — || align=right | 3.0 km || 
|-id=676 bgcolor=#E9E9E9
| 159676 ||  || — || April 16, 2002 || Socorro || LINEAR || — || align=right | 4.5 km || 
|-id=677 bgcolor=#FFC2E0
| 159677 ||  || — || April 22, 2002 || Palomar || NEAT || APOcritical || align=right data-sort-value="0.47" | 470 m || 
|-id=678 bgcolor=#E9E9E9
| 159678 ||  || — || May 7, 2002 || Palomar || NEAT || MRX || align=right | 1.9 km || 
|-id=679 bgcolor=#E9E9E9
| 159679 ||  || — || May 8, 2002 || Socorro || LINEAR || — || align=right | 5.0 km || 
|-id=680 bgcolor=#E9E9E9
| 159680 ||  || — || May 11, 2002 || Kitt Peak || Spacewatch || AEO || align=right | 1.7 km || 
|-id=681 bgcolor=#E9E9E9
| 159681 ||  || — || May 11, 2002 || Socorro || LINEAR || — || align=right | 4.8 km || 
|-id=682 bgcolor=#E9E9E9
| 159682 ||  || — || May 6, 2002 || Anderson Mesa || LONEOS || ADE || align=right | 5.7 km || 
|-id=683 bgcolor=#E9E9E9
| 159683 ||  || — || May 14, 2002 || Needville || Needville Obs. || — || align=right | 3.3 km || 
|-id=684 bgcolor=#E9E9E9
| 159684 || 2002 KC || — || May 16, 2002 || Fountain Hills || Fountain Hills Obs. || — || align=right | 5.2 km || 
|-id=685 bgcolor=#fefefe
| 159685 ||  || — || June 5, 2002 || Socorro || LINEAR || H || align=right | 1.1 km || 
|-id=686 bgcolor=#FFC2E0
| 159686 ||  || — || June 7, 2002 || Socorro || LINEAR || APO +1km || align=right | 1.8 km || 
|-id=687 bgcolor=#d6d6d6
| 159687 ||  || — || June 8, 2002 || Socorro || LINEAR || TIR || align=right | 5.4 km || 
|-id=688 bgcolor=#d6d6d6
| 159688 ||  || — || June 12, 2002 || Palomar || NEAT || — || align=right | 5.4 km || 
|-id=689 bgcolor=#d6d6d6
| 159689 ||  || — || June 23, 2002 || Palomar || NEAT || — || align=right | 6.2 km || 
|-id=690 bgcolor=#d6d6d6
| 159690 ||  || — || July 4, 2002 || Palomar || NEAT || THM || align=right | 4.0 km || 
|-id=691 bgcolor=#d6d6d6
| 159691 ||  || — || July 1, 2002 || Palomar || NEAT || — || align=right | 6.1 km || 
|-id=692 bgcolor=#d6d6d6
| 159692 ||  || — || July 22, 2002 || Palomar || NEAT || — || align=right | 5.7 km || 
|-id=693 bgcolor=#d6d6d6
| 159693 ||  || — || August 4, 2002 || Palomar || NEAT || ALA || align=right | 6.0 km || 
|-id=694 bgcolor=#d6d6d6
| 159694 ||  || — || August 6, 2002 || Palomar || NEAT || — || align=right | 3.7 km || 
|-id=695 bgcolor=#fefefe
| 159695 ||  || — || August 11, 2002 || Socorro || LINEAR || H || align=right data-sort-value="0.96" | 960 m || 
|-id=696 bgcolor=#d6d6d6
| 159696 ||  || — || August 12, 2002 || Socorro || LINEAR || — || align=right | 9.1 km || 
|-id=697 bgcolor=#d6d6d6
| 159697 ||  || — || August 12, 2002 || Haleakala || NEAT || HYG || align=right | 4.0 km || 
|-id=698 bgcolor=#d6d6d6
| 159698 ||  || — || August 12, 2002 || Socorro || LINEAR || EOS || align=right | 3.6 km || 
|-id=699 bgcolor=#FFC2E0
| 159699 ||  || — || August 12, 2002 || Socorro || LINEAR || APO +1km || align=right | 1.0 km || 
|-id=700 bgcolor=#d6d6d6
| 159700 ||  || — || August 8, 2002 || Palomar || S. F. Hönig || — || align=right | 4.4 km || 
|}

159701–159800 

|-bgcolor=#d6d6d6
| 159701 ||  || — || August 27, 2002 || Palomar || NEAT || 7:4 || align=right | 4.8 km || 
|-id=702 bgcolor=#d6d6d6
| 159702 ||  || — || September 4, 2002 || Palomar || NEAT || EOS || align=right | 4.0 km || 
|-id=703 bgcolor=#d6d6d6
| 159703 ||  || — || September 6, 2002 || Socorro || LINEAR || — || align=right | 7.2 km || 
|-id=704 bgcolor=#d6d6d6
| 159704 ||  || — || September 12, 2002 || Palomar || NEAT || — || align=right | 8.5 km || 
|-id=705 bgcolor=#d6d6d6
| 159705 ||  || — || September 15, 2002 || Palomar || NEAT || HYG || align=right | 4.0 km || 
|-id=706 bgcolor=#d6d6d6
| 159706 ||  || — || September 30, 2002 || Haleakala || NEAT || — || align=right | 6.7 km || 
|-id=707 bgcolor=#d6d6d6
| 159707 ||  || — || October 4, 2002 || Anderson Mesa || LONEOS || — || align=right | 7.1 km || 
|-id=708 bgcolor=#d6d6d6
| 159708 ||  || — || October 13, 2002 || Palomar || NEAT || — || align=right | 8.1 km || 
|-id=709 bgcolor=#d6d6d6
| 159709 ||  || — || October 5, 2002 || Anderson Mesa || LONEOS || — || align=right | 8.5 km || 
|-id=710 bgcolor=#d6d6d6
| 159710 ||  || — || October 10, 2002 || Socorro || LINEAR || — || align=right | 9.9 km || 
|-id=711 bgcolor=#d6d6d6
| 159711 ||  || — || October 15, 2002 || Socorro || LINEAR || — || align=right | 7.9 km || 
|-id=712 bgcolor=#d6d6d6
| 159712 ||  || — || November 5, 2002 || Palomar || NEAT || — || align=right | 5.3 km || 
|-id=713 bgcolor=#d6d6d6
| 159713 ||  || — || November 6, 2002 || Socorro || LINEAR || — || align=right | 5.9 km || 
|-id=714 bgcolor=#d6d6d6
| 159714 ||  || — || November 7, 2002 || Socorro || LINEAR || — || align=right | 7.4 km || 
|-id=715 bgcolor=#fefefe
| 159715 ||  || — || November 12, 2002 || Socorro || LINEAR || H || align=right | 1.3 km || 
|-id=716 bgcolor=#E9E9E9
| 159716 ||  || — || December 31, 2002 || Socorro || LINEAR || — || align=right | 1.8 km || 
|-id=717 bgcolor=#fefefe
| 159717 ||  || — || January 5, 2003 || Tenagra II || P. R. Holvorcem, M. Schwartz || — || align=right data-sort-value="0.88" | 880 m || 
|-id=718 bgcolor=#fefefe
| 159718 ||  || — || January 5, 2003 || Socorro || LINEAR || — || align=right | 1.5 km || 
|-id=719 bgcolor=#E9E9E9
| 159719 ||  || — || January 7, 2003 || Socorro || LINEAR || — || align=right | 2.2 km || 
|-id=720 bgcolor=#fefefe
| 159720 ||  || — || January 5, 2003 || Socorro || LINEAR || — || align=right | 1.7 km || 
|-id=721 bgcolor=#fefefe
| 159721 ||  || — || January 26, 2003 || Anderson Mesa || LONEOS || — || align=right | 3.2 km || 
|-id=722 bgcolor=#fefefe
| 159722 ||  || — || January 26, 2003 || Anderson Mesa || LONEOS || ERI || align=right | 2.4 km || 
|-id=723 bgcolor=#fefefe
| 159723 ||  || — || January 27, 2003 || Socorro || LINEAR || — || align=right | 1.3 km || 
|-id=724 bgcolor=#fefefe
| 159724 ||  || — || January 27, 2003 || Palomar || NEAT || — || align=right | 1.5 km || 
|-id=725 bgcolor=#fefefe
| 159725 ||  || — || January 28, 2003 || Socorro || LINEAR || — || align=right | 1.7 km || 
|-id=726 bgcolor=#fefefe
| 159726 ||  || — || January 31, 2003 || Socorro || LINEAR || — || align=right | 1.2 km || 
|-id=727 bgcolor=#fefefe
| 159727 ||  || — || January 31, 2003 || Socorro || LINEAR || FLO || align=right | 1.4 km || 
|-id=728 bgcolor=#fefefe
| 159728 ||  || — || January 26, 2003 || Anderson Mesa || LONEOS || — || align=right | 1.6 km || 
|-id=729 bgcolor=#fefefe
| 159729 ||  || — || February 21, 2003 || Palomar || NEAT || — || align=right | 1.3 km || 
|-id=730 bgcolor=#fefefe
| 159730 ||  || — || February 24, 2003 || Haleakala || NEAT || — || align=right | 1.2 km || 
|-id=731 bgcolor=#fefefe
| 159731 ||  || — || February 21, 2003 || Palomar || NEAT || — || align=right data-sort-value="0.92" | 920 m || 
|-id=732 bgcolor=#fefefe
| 159732 ||  || — || February 24, 2003 || Bergisch Gladbach || W. Bickel || V || align=right | 1.3 km || 
|-id=733 bgcolor=#fefefe
| 159733 ||  || — || March 6, 2003 || Anderson Mesa || LONEOS || NYS || align=right | 1.2 km || 
|-id=734 bgcolor=#fefefe
| 159734 ||  || — || March 6, 2003 || Socorro || LINEAR || — || align=right | 1.6 km || 
|-id=735 bgcolor=#fefefe
| 159735 ||  || — || March 6, 2003 || Anderson Mesa || LONEOS || NYS || align=right | 1.0 km || 
|-id=736 bgcolor=#fefefe
| 159736 ||  || — || March 5, 2003 || Socorro || LINEAR || ERI || align=right | 3.4 km || 
|-id=737 bgcolor=#fefefe
| 159737 ||  || — || March 6, 2003 || Socorro || LINEAR || NYS || align=right data-sort-value="0.91" | 910 m || 
|-id=738 bgcolor=#fefefe
| 159738 ||  || — || March 8, 2003 || Anderson Mesa || LONEOS || — || align=right | 1.5 km || 
|-id=739 bgcolor=#fefefe
| 159739 ||  || — || March 7, 2003 || Socorro || LINEAR || V || align=right data-sort-value="0.98" | 980 m || 
|-id=740 bgcolor=#fefefe
| 159740 ||  || — || March 9, 2003 || Anderson Mesa || LONEOS || — || align=right | 2.3 km || 
|-id=741 bgcolor=#fefefe
| 159741 ||  || — || March 10, 2003 || Anderson Mesa || LONEOS || — || align=right | 1.4 km || 
|-id=742 bgcolor=#fefefe
| 159742 ||  || — || March 10, 2003 || Anderson Mesa || LONEOS || NYS || align=right | 1.8 km || 
|-id=743 bgcolor=#fefefe
| 159743 Kluk ||  ||  || March 23, 2003 || Kleť || KLENOT || NYS || align=right data-sort-value="0.97" | 970 m || 
|-id=744 bgcolor=#fefefe
| 159744 ||  || — || March 23, 2003 || Kitt Peak || Spacewatch || NYS || align=right | 1.00 km || 
|-id=745 bgcolor=#fefefe
| 159745 ||  || — || March 24, 2003 || Kitt Peak || Spacewatch || — || align=right | 1.3 km || 
|-id=746 bgcolor=#fefefe
| 159746 ||  || — || March 23, 2003 || Palomar || NEAT || — || align=right | 1.3 km || 
|-id=747 bgcolor=#fefefe
| 159747 ||  || — || March 23, 2003 || Catalina || CSS || — || align=right | 1.5 km || 
|-id=748 bgcolor=#fefefe
| 159748 ||  || — || March 25, 2003 || Palomar || NEAT || — || align=right | 1.5 km || 
|-id=749 bgcolor=#fefefe
| 159749 ||  || — || March 25, 2003 || Haleakala || NEAT || MAS || align=right | 1.2 km || 
|-id=750 bgcolor=#fefefe
| 159750 ||  || — || March 26, 2003 || Kitt Peak || Spacewatch || FLO || align=right | 1.4 km || 
|-id=751 bgcolor=#fefefe
| 159751 ||  || — || March 26, 2003 || Palomar || NEAT || KLI || align=right | 3.0 km || 
|-id=752 bgcolor=#fefefe
| 159752 ||  || — || March 26, 2003 || Palomar || NEAT || — || align=right | 1.3 km || 
|-id=753 bgcolor=#fefefe
| 159753 ||  || — || March 26, 2003 || Kitt Peak || Spacewatch || — || align=right | 1.1 km || 
|-id=754 bgcolor=#fefefe
| 159754 ||  || — || March 29, 2003 || Anderson Mesa || LONEOS || — || align=right | 1.4 km || 
|-id=755 bgcolor=#fefefe
| 159755 ||  || — || March 31, 2003 || Anderson Mesa || LONEOS || — || align=right | 1.6 km || 
|-id=756 bgcolor=#fefefe
| 159756 ||  || — || March 30, 2003 || Socorro || LINEAR || V || align=right | 1.3 km || 
|-id=757 bgcolor=#fefefe
| 159757 ||  || — || March 23, 2003 || Kitt Peak || Spacewatch || NYS || align=right | 1.2 km || 
|-id=758 bgcolor=#fefefe
| 159758 ||  || — || March 31, 2003 || Cerro Tololo || DLS || V || align=right | 1.1 km || 
|-id=759 bgcolor=#fefefe
| 159759 || 2003 GK || — || April 1, 2003 || Socorro || LINEAR || — || align=right | 1.8 km || 
|-id=760 bgcolor=#fefefe
| 159760 ||  || — || April 1, 2003 || Socorro || LINEAR || — || align=right | 1.3 km || 
|-id=761 bgcolor=#fefefe
| 159761 ||  || — || April 6, 2003 || Kitt Peak || Spacewatch || NYS || align=right | 1.3 km || 
|-id=762 bgcolor=#fefefe
| 159762 ||  || — || April 8, 2003 || Socorro || LINEAR || NYS || align=right | 1.2 km || 
|-id=763 bgcolor=#fefefe
| 159763 ||  || — || April 8, 2003 || Palomar || NEAT || — || align=right | 1.6 km || 
|-id=764 bgcolor=#fefefe
| 159764 ||  || — || April 1, 2003 || Catalina || CSS || — || align=right | 1.4 km || 
|-id=765 bgcolor=#fefefe
| 159765 ||  || — || April 25, 2003 || Socorro || LINEAR || — || align=right | 1.8 km || 
|-id=766 bgcolor=#fefefe
| 159766 ||  || — || April 25, 2003 || Anderson Mesa || LONEOS || — || align=right | 1.9 km || 
|-id=767 bgcolor=#fefefe
| 159767 ||  || — || April 24, 2003 || Anderson Mesa || LONEOS || — || align=right | 1.6 km || 
|-id=768 bgcolor=#fefefe
| 159768 ||  || — || April 24, 2003 || Kitt Peak || Spacewatch || — || align=right | 1.3 km || 
|-id=769 bgcolor=#fefefe
| 159769 ||  || — || April 29, 2003 || Socorro || LINEAR || NYS || align=right | 1.2 km || 
|-id=770 bgcolor=#E9E9E9
| 159770 ||  || — || April 28, 2003 || Socorro || LINEAR || — || align=right | 6.1 km || 
|-id=771 bgcolor=#E9E9E9
| 159771 ||  || — || April 28, 2003 || Haleakala || NEAT || — || align=right | 2.1 km || 
|-id=772 bgcolor=#fefefe
| 159772 ||  || — || April 29, 2003 || Anderson Mesa || LONEOS || MAS || align=right data-sort-value="0.98" | 980 m || 
|-id=773 bgcolor=#fefefe
| 159773 ||  || — || May 1, 2003 || Socorro || LINEAR || MAS || align=right | 1.3 km || 
|-id=774 bgcolor=#fefefe
| 159774 ||  || — || May 2, 2003 || Kitt Peak || Spacewatch || V || align=right | 1.1 km || 
|-id=775 bgcolor=#fefefe
| 159775 ||  || — || May 5, 2003 || Kitt Peak || Spacewatch || NYS || align=right data-sort-value="0.90" | 900 m || 
|-id=776 bgcolor=#E9E9E9
| 159776 Eduardoröhl ||  ||  || May 2, 2003 || Mérida || I. R. Ferrín, C. Leal || — || align=right | 1.9 km || 
|-id=777 bgcolor=#E9E9E9
| 159777 || 2003 KX || — || May 21, 2003 || Reedy Creek || J. Broughton || — || align=right | 4.7 km || 
|-id=778 bgcolor=#fefefe
| 159778 Bobshelton ||  ||  || June 24, 2003 || Junk Bond || D. Healy || NYS || align=right | 1.1 km || 
|-id=779 bgcolor=#fefefe
| 159779 ||  || — || June 25, 2003 || Socorro || LINEAR || PHO || align=right | 2.4 km || 
|-id=780 bgcolor=#E9E9E9
| 159780 ||  || — || June 26, 2003 || Haleakala || NEAT || — || align=right | 4.0 km || 
|-id=781 bgcolor=#FA8072
| 159781 ||  || — || June 28, 2003 || Socorro || LINEAR || — || align=right | 4.2 km || 
|-id=782 bgcolor=#E9E9E9
| 159782 ||  || — || June 29, 2003 || Socorro || LINEAR || JUL || align=right | 2.4 km || 
|-id=783 bgcolor=#E9E9E9
| 159783 ||  || — || June 29, 2003 || Reedy Creek || J. Broughton || MIT || align=right | 6.1 km || 
|-id=784 bgcolor=#E9E9E9
| 159784 ||  || — || June 26, 2003 || Socorro || LINEAR || ADE || align=right | 5.7 km || 
|-id=785 bgcolor=#E9E9E9
| 159785 ||  || — || July 4, 2003 || Kitt Peak || Spacewatch || JUN || align=right | 1.7 km || 
|-id=786 bgcolor=#E9E9E9
| 159786 ||  || — || July 14, 2003 || Great Shefford || P. Birtwhistle || — || align=right | 2.6 km || 
|-id=787 bgcolor=#E9E9E9
| 159787 ||  || — || July 30, 2003 || Palomar || NEAT || — || align=right | 3.6 km || 
|-id=788 bgcolor=#E9E9E9
| 159788 ||  || — || July 30, 2003 || Campo Imperatore || CINEOS || HEN || align=right | 1.6 km || 
|-id=789 bgcolor=#E9E9E9
| 159789 ||  || — || August 1, 2003 || Haleakala || NEAT || ADE || align=right | 3.8 km || 
|-id=790 bgcolor=#E9E9E9
| 159790 ||  || — || August 1, 2003 || Socorro || LINEAR || — || align=right | 2.9 km || 
|-id=791 bgcolor=#E9E9E9
| 159791 ||  || — || August 22, 2003 || Palomar || NEAT || — || align=right | 1.7 km || 
|-id=792 bgcolor=#E9E9E9
| 159792 ||  || — || August 23, 2003 || Socorro || LINEAR || GAL || align=right | 2.9 km || 
|-id=793 bgcolor=#FA8072
| 159793 ||  || — || August 23, 2003 || Socorro || LINEAR || — || align=right | 2.0 km || 
|-id=794 bgcolor=#E9E9E9
| 159794 ||  || — || August 29, 2003 || Haleakala || NEAT || IAN || align=right | 1.3 km || 
|-id=795 bgcolor=#d6d6d6
| 159795 ||  || — || August 31, 2003 || Haleakala || NEAT || — || align=right | 8.8 km || 
|-id=796 bgcolor=#E9E9E9
| 159796 ||  || — || August 26, 2003 || Haleakala || NEAT || — || align=right | 4.9 km || 
|-id=797 bgcolor=#E9E9E9
| 159797 ||  || — || August 23, 2003 || Palomar || NEAT || — || align=right | 2.0 km || 
|-id=798 bgcolor=#E9E9E9
| 159798 ||  || — || September 1, 2003 || Socorro || LINEAR || — || align=right | 6.1 km || 
|-id=799 bgcolor=#E9E9E9
| 159799 Kralice ||  ||  || September 15, 2003 || Kleť || KLENOT || — || align=right | 5.3 km || 
|-id=800 bgcolor=#d6d6d6
| 159800 ||  || — || September 15, 2003 || Haleakala || NEAT || — || align=right | 3.8 km || 
|}

159801–159900 

|-bgcolor=#d6d6d6
| 159801 ||  || — || September 15, 2003 || Palomar || NEAT || EOS || align=right | 3.9 km || 
|-id=802 bgcolor=#d6d6d6
| 159802 ||  || — || September 15, 2003 || Palomar || NEAT || — || align=right | 6.0 km || 
|-id=803 bgcolor=#d6d6d6
| 159803 ||  || — || September 13, 2003 || Haleakala || NEAT || KOR || align=right | 2.4 km || 
|-id=804 bgcolor=#d6d6d6
| 159804 ||  || — || September 16, 2003 || Kitt Peak || Spacewatch || — || align=right | 4.2 km || 
|-id=805 bgcolor=#d6d6d6
| 159805 ||  || — || September 18, 2003 || Palomar || NEAT || EOS || align=right | 4.9 km || 
|-id=806 bgcolor=#d6d6d6
| 159806 ||  || — || September 18, 2003 || Palomar || NEAT || — || align=right | 6.8 km || 
|-id=807 bgcolor=#d6d6d6
| 159807 ||  || — || September 18, 2003 || Palomar || NEAT || — || align=right | 4.7 km || 
|-id=808 bgcolor=#d6d6d6
| 159808 ||  || — || September 18, 2003 || Kitt Peak || Spacewatch || ALA || align=right | 5.4 km || 
|-id=809 bgcolor=#d6d6d6
| 159809 ||  || — || September 19, 2003 || Kitt Peak || Spacewatch || — || align=right | 5.3 km || 
|-id=810 bgcolor=#d6d6d6
| 159810 ||  || — || September 18, 2003 || Palomar || NEAT || — || align=right | 4.4 km || 
|-id=811 bgcolor=#d6d6d6
| 159811 ||  || — || September 16, 2003 || Socorro || LINEAR || — || align=right | 4.2 km || 
|-id=812 bgcolor=#d6d6d6
| 159812 ||  || — || September 22, 2003 || Anderson Mesa || LONEOS || — || align=right | 6.1 km || 
|-id=813 bgcolor=#d6d6d6
| 159813 ||  || — || September 20, 2003 || Palomar || NEAT || URS || align=right | 6.0 km || 
|-id=814 bgcolor=#E9E9E9
| 159814 Saguaro ||  ||  || September 27, 2003 || Kleť || KLENOT || — || align=right | 3.4 km || 
|-id=815 bgcolor=#d6d6d6
| 159815 ||  || — || September 26, 2003 || Goodricke-Pigott || R. A. Tucker || — || align=right | 7.5 km || 
|-id=816 bgcolor=#d6d6d6
| 159816 ||  || — || September 24, 2003 || Haleakala || NEAT || — || align=right | 5.8 km || 
|-id=817 bgcolor=#E9E9E9
| 159817 ||  || — || September 25, 2003 || Palomar || NEAT || — || align=right | 3.8 km || 
|-id=818 bgcolor=#d6d6d6
| 159818 ||  || — || September 28, 2003 || Socorro || LINEAR || — || align=right | 5.0 km || 
|-id=819 bgcolor=#E9E9E9
| 159819 ||  || — || September 20, 2003 || Socorro || LINEAR || DOR || align=right | 4.3 km || 
|-id=820 bgcolor=#d6d6d6
| 159820 ||  || — || September 21, 2003 || Palomar || NEAT || — || align=right | 4.9 km || 
|-id=821 bgcolor=#d6d6d6
| 159821 ||  || — || September 28, 2003 || Socorro || LINEAR || — || align=right | 4.9 km || 
|-id=822 bgcolor=#d6d6d6
| 159822 ||  || — || September 17, 2003 || Palomar || NEAT || — || align=right | 4.6 km || 
|-id=823 bgcolor=#d6d6d6
| 159823 ||  || — || September 28, 2003 || Anderson Mesa || LONEOS || VER || align=right | 5.3 km || 
|-id=824 bgcolor=#d6d6d6
| 159824 ||  || — || September 28, 2003 || Haleakala || NEAT || — || align=right | 7.6 km || 
|-id=825 bgcolor=#d6d6d6
| 159825 ||  || — || September 20, 2003 || Kitt Peak || Spacewatch || — || align=right | 5.1 km || 
|-id=826 bgcolor=#d6d6d6
| 159826 Knapp ||  ||  || September 26, 2003 || Apache Point || SDSS || — || align=right | 3.9 km || 
|-id=827 bgcolor=#d6d6d6
| 159827 Keithmullen ||  ||  || October 4, 2003 || Junk Bond || D. Healy || HYG || align=right | 5.7 km || 
|-id=828 bgcolor=#E9E9E9
| 159828 ||  || — || October 15, 2003 || Palomar || NEAT || VIB || align=right | 4.4 km || 
|-id=829 bgcolor=#d6d6d6
| 159829 ||  || — || October 15, 2003 || Anderson Mesa || LONEOS || — || align=right | 5.7 km || 
|-id=830 bgcolor=#d6d6d6
| 159830 ||  || — || October 16, 2003 || Palomar || NEAT || — || align=right | 4.2 km || 
|-id=831 bgcolor=#E9E9E9
| 159831 ||  || — || October 16, 2003 || Anderson Mesa || LONEOS || — || align=right | 4.4 km || 
|-id=832 bgcolor=#d6d6d6
| 159832 ||  || — || October 16, 2003 || Anderson Mesa || LONEOS || ALA || align=right | 7.8 km || 
|-id=833 bgcolor=#d6d6d6
| 159833 ||  || — || October 20, 2003 || Kitt Peak || Spacewatch || HYG || align=right | 5.2 km || 
|-id=834 bgcolor=#d6d6d6
| 159834 ||  || — || October 21, 2003 || Socorro || LINEAR || URS || align=right | 6.9 km || 
|-id=835 bgcolor=#d6d6d6
| 159835 ||  || — || October 20, 2003 || Palomar || NEAT || INA || align=right | 6.7 km || 
|-id=836 bgcolor=#d6d6d6
| 159836 ||  || — || October 16, 2003 || Palomar || NEAT || — || align=right | 5.2 km || 
|-id=837 bgcolor=#d6d6d6
| 159837 ||  || — || October 20, 2003 || Socorro || LINEAR || HYG || align=right | 4.4 km || 
|-id=838 bgcolor=#d6d6d6
| 159838 ||  || — || October 21, 2003 || Socorro || LINEAR || HYG || align=right | 3.7 km || 
|-id=839 bgcolor=#d6d6d6
| 159839 ||  || — || October 19, 2003 || Kitt Peak || Spacewatch || — || align=right | 4.2 km || 
|-id=840 bgcolor=#d6d6d6
| 159840 ||  || — || October 24, 2003 || Haleakala || NEAT || HYG || align=right | 6.2 km || 
|-id=841 bgcolor=#d6d6d6
| 159841 ||  || — || October 27, 2003 || Socorro || LINEAR || — || align=right | 6.8 km || 
|-id=842 bgcolor=#d6d6d6
| 159842 ||  || — || October 29, 2003 || Anderson Mesa || LONEOS || — || align=right | 4.9 km || 
|-id=843 bgcolor=#d6d6d6
| 159843 ||  || — || November 15, 2003 || Goodricke-Pigott || R. A. Tucker || — || align=right | 5.7 km || 
|-id=844 bgcolor=#d6d6d6
| 159844 ||  || — || November 18, 2003 || Palomar || NEAT || EOS || align=right | 3.6 km || 
|-id=845 bgcolor=#d6d6d6
| 159845 ||  || — || November 19, 2003 || Kitt Peak || Spacewatch || MEL || align=right | 6.0 km || 
|-id=846 bgcolor=#d6d6d6
| 159846 ||  || — || November 19, 2003 || Kitt Peak || Spacewatch || — || align=right | 3.4 km || 
|-id=847 bgcolor=#d6d6d6
| 159847 ||  || — || November 20, 2003 || Palomar || NEAT || — || align=right | 7.3 km || 
|-id=848 bgcolor=#d6d6d6
| 159848 ||  || — || November 21, 2003 || Palomar || NEAT || EUP || align=right | 9.0 km || 
|-id=849 bgcolor=#d6d6d6
| 159849 ||  || — || December 3, 2003 || Socorro || LINEAR || — || align=right | 5.7 km || 
|-id=850 bgcolor=#d6d6d6
| 159850 ||  || — || December 18, 2003 || Haleakala || NEAT || EOS || align=right | 3.7 km || 
|-id=851 bgcolor=#d6d6d6
| 159851 ||  || — || December 17, 2003 || Needville || W. G. Dillon, J. Dellinger || HYG || align=right | 5.7 km || 
|-id=852 bgcolor=#E9E9E9
| 159852 ||  || — || December 28, 2003 || Socorro || LINEAR || — || align=right | 3.5 km || 
|-id=853 bgcolor=#fefefe
| 159853 ||  || — || March 20, 2004 || Tenagra II || M. Schwartz, P. R. Holvorcem || H || align=right data-sort-value="0.73" | 730 m || 
|-id=854 bgcolor=#fefefe
| 159854 ||  || — || March 20, 2004 || Siding Spring || SSS || H || align=right | 1.1 km || 
|-id=855 bgcolor=#fefefe
| 159855 ||  || — || March 30, 2004 || Socorro || LINEAR || H || align=right | 1.0 km || 
|-id=856 bgcolor=#FFC2E0
| 159856 ||  || — || May 13, 2004 || Socorro || LINEAR || AMO +1km || align=right data-sort-value="0.90" | 900 m || 
|-id=857 bgcolor=#FFC2E0
| 159857 ||  || — || June 10, 2004 || Socorro || LINEAR || APO +1kmPHA || align=right | 3.1 km || 
|-id=858 bgcolor=#fefefe
| 159858 ||  || — || June 12, 2004 || Palomar || NEAT || — || align=right data-sort-value="0.95" | 950 m || 
|-id=859 bgcolor=#FA8072
| 159859 ||  || — || June 15, 2004 || Socorro || LINEAR || — || align=right | 2.1 km || 
|-id=860 bgcolor=#fefefe
| 159860 ||  || — || August 7, 2004 || Palomar || NEAT || — || align=right | 1.1 km || 
|-id=861 bgcolor=#fefefe
| 159861 ||  || — || August 6, 2004 || Palomar || NEAT || V || align=right | 1.0 km || 
|-id=862 bgcolor=#fefefe
| 159862 ||  || — || August 8, 2004 || Anderson Mesa || LONEOS || — || align=right | 1.6 km || 
|-id=863 bgcolor=#fefefe
| 159863 ||  || — || August 8, 2004 || Socorro || LINEAR || FLO || align=right | 1.1 km || 
|-id=864 bgcolor=#fefefe
| 159864 ||  || — || August 8, 2004 || Socorro || LINEAR || FLO || align=right | 1.4 km || 
|-id=865 bgcolor=#fefefe
| 159865 Silvialonso ||  ||  || August 12, 2004 || Begues || J. Manteca || — || align=right | 1.8 km || 
|-id=866 bgcolor=#fefefe
| 159866 ||  || — || August 8, 2004 || Anderson Mesa || LONEOS || — || align=right | 1.3 km || 
|-id=867 bgcolor=#fefefe
| 159867 ||  || — || August 9, 2004 || Socorro || LINEAR || FLO || align=right data-sort-value="0.95" | 950 m || 
|-id=868 bgcolor=#fefefe
| 159868 ||  || — || August 12, 2004 || Socorro || LINEAR || — || align=right | 1.4 km || 
|-id=869 bgcolor=#fefefe
| 159869 ||  || — || August 10, 2004 || Socorro || LINEAR || — || align=right | 1.2 km || 
|-id=870 bgcolor=#fefefe
| 159870 ||  || — || August 12, 2004 || Socorro || LINEAR || V || align=right | 1.2 km || 
|-id=871 bgcolor=#fefefe
| 159871 ||  || — || August 23, 2004 || Wise || Wise Obs. || — || align=right | 1.7 km || 
|-id=872 bgcolor=#fefefe
| 159872 ||  || — || September 7, 2004 || Socorro || LINEAR || — || align=right | 1.2 km || 
|-id=873 bgcolor=#fefefe
| 159873 ||  || — || September 7, 2004 || Socorro || LINEAR || — || align=right | 2.0 km || 
|-id=874 bgcolor=#E9E9E9
| 159874 ||  || — || September 8, 2004 || Socorro || LINEAR || — || align=right | 3.2 km || 
|-id=875 bgcolor=#fefefe
| 159875 ||  || — || September 8, 2004 || Socorro || LINEAR || V || align=right data-sort-value="0.99" | 990 m || 
|-id=876 bgcolor=#fefefe
| 159876 ||  || — || September 8, 2004 || Socorro || LINEAR || V || align=right | 1.1 km || 
|-id=877 bgcolor=#fefefe
| 159877 ||  || — || September 8, 2004 || Socorro || LINEAR || NYS || align=right | 2.1 km || 
|-id=878 bgcolor=#E9E9E9
| 159878 ||  || — || September 8, 2004 || Palomar || NEAT || — || align=right | 2.8 km || 
|-id=879 bgcolor=#fefefe
| 159879 ||  || — || September 9, 2004 || Socorro || LINEAR || MAS || align=right data-sort-value="0.96" | 960 m || 
|-id=880 bgcolor=#fefefe
| 159880 ||  || — || September 10, 2004 || Socorro || LINEAR || V || align=right | 1.3 km || 
|-id=881 bgcolor=#fefefe
| 159881 ||  || — || September 6, 2004 || Palomar || NEAT || V || align=right | 1.1 km || 
|-id=882 bgcolor=#FA8072
| 159882 ||  || — || September 14, 2004 || Goodricke-Pigott || R. A. Tucker || — || align=right | 1.4 km || 
|-id=883 bgcolor=#E9E9E9
| 159883 ||  || — || September 13, 2004 || Socorro || LINEAR || — || align=right | 4.0 km || 
|-id=884 bgcolor=#fefefe
| 159884 ||  || — || September 13, 2004 || Palomar || NEAT || — || align=right | 1.2 km || 
|-id=885 bgcolor=#fefefe
| 159885 ||  || — || September 17, 2004 || Anderson Mesa || LONEOS || V || align=right | 1.1 km || 
|-id=886 bgcolor=#d6d6d6
| 159886 ||  || — || September 17, 2004 || Socorro || LINEAR || 7:4 || align=right | 7.3 km || 
|-id=887 bgcolor=#E9E9E9
| 159887 ||  || — || September 22, 2004 || Socorro || LINEAR || — || align=right | 5.1 km || 
|-id=888 bgcolor=#E9E9E9
| 159888 ||  || — || September 22, 2004 || Socorro || LINEAR || — || align=right | 4.2 km || 
|-id=889 bgcolor=#FA8072
| 159889 ||  || — || October 10, 2004 || Socorro || LINEAR || — || align=right | 1.8 km || 
|-id=890 bgcolor=#fefefe
| 159890 ||  || — || October 9, 2004 || Kitt Peak || Spacewatch || — || align=right | 1.1 km || 
|-id=891 bgcolor=#E9E9E9
| 159891 ||  || — || October 5, 2004 || Kitt Peak || Spacewatch || AST || align=right | 4.2 km || 
|-id=892 bgcolor=#E9E9E9
| 159892 ||  || — || October 5, 2004 || Anderson Mesa || LONEOS || — || align=right | 2.0 km || 
|-id=893 bgcolor=#fefefe
| 159893 ||  || — || October 7, 2004 || Socorro || LINEAR || — || align=right | 1.2 km || 
|-id=894 bgcolor=#E9E9E9
| 159894 ||  || — || October 7, 2004 || Kitt Peak || Spacewatch || — || align=right | 3.1 km || 
|-id=895 bgcolor=#fefefe
| 159895 ||  || — || October 6, 2004 || Kitt Peak || Spacewatch || — || align=right data-sort-value="0.97" | 970 m || 
|-id=896 bgcolor=#fefefe
| 159896 ||  || — || October 6, 2004 || Socorro || LINEAR || V || align=right data-sort-value="0.92" | 920 m || 
|-id=897 bgcolor=#fefefe
| 159897 ||  || — || October 7, 2004 || Socorro || LINEAR || NYS || align=right data-sort-value="0.92" | 920 m || 
|-id=898 bgcolor=#FA8072
| 159898 ||  || — || October 12, 2004 || Kitt Peak || Spacewatch || — || align=right | 1.2 km || 
|-id=899 bgcolor=#E9E9E9
| 159899 ||  || — || October 12, 2004 || Kvistaberg || UDAS || — || align=right | 4.5 km || 
|-id=900 bgcolor=#E9E9E9
| 159900 ||  || — || October 7, 2004 || Palomar || NEAT || — || align=right | 3.9 km || 
|}

159901–160000 

|-bgcolor=#E9E9E9
| 159901 ||  || — || October 15, 2004 || Mount Lemmon || Mount Lemmon Survey || — || align=right | 2.2 km || 
|-id=902 bgcolor=#fefefe
| 159902 Gladstone ||  ||  || October 11, 2004 || Kitt Peak || M. W. Buie || — || align=right | 1.2 km || 
|-id=903 bgcolor=#E9E9E9
| 159903 ||  || — || November 3, 2004 || Kitt Peak || Spacewatch || — || align=right | 3.1 km || 
|-id=904 bgcolor=#d6d6d6
| 159904 ||  || — || November 3, 2004 || Anderson Mesa || LONEOS || — || align=right | 5.1 km || 
|-id=905 bgcolor=#E9E9E9
| 159905 ||  || — || November 3, 2004 || Palomar || NEAT || — || align=right | 1.5 km || 
|-id=906 bgcolor=#E9E9E9
| 159906 ||  || — || November 5, 2004 || Needville || J. Dellinger, A. Lowe || — || align=right | 3.4 km || 
|-id=907 bgcolor=#E9E9E9
| 159907 ||  || — || November 3, 2004 || Anderson Mesa || LONEOS || RAF || align=right | 1.8 km || 
|-id=908 bgcolor=#d6d6d6
| 159908 ||  || — || November 4, 2004 || Catalina || CSS || — || align=right | 4.5 km || 
|-id=909 bgcolor=#d6d6d6
| 159909 ||  || — || November 5, 2004 || Campo Imperatore || CINEOS || — || align=right | 5.4 km || 
|-id=910 bgcolor=#d6d6d6
| 159910 ||  || — || November 4, 2004 || Kitt Peak || Spacewatch || THM || align=right | 3.7 km || 
|-id=911 bgcolor=#d6d6d6
| 159911 ||  || — || November 4, 2004 || Kitt Peak || Spacewatch || EOS || align=right | 2.8 km || 
|-id=912 bgcolor=#E9E9E9
| 159912 ||  || — || November 4, 2004 || Kitt Peak || Spacewatch || — || align=right | 4.1 km || 
|-id=913 bgcolor=#d6d6d6
| 159913 ||  || — || November 10, 2004 || Kitt Peak || Spacewatch || EOS || align=right | 3.7 km || 
|-id=914 bgcolor=#E9E9E9
| 159914 ||  || — || November 4, 2004 || Anderson Mesa || LONEOS || — || align=right | 2.5 km || 
|-id=915 bgcolor=#d6d6d6
| 159915 ||  || — || November 4, 2004 || Kitt Peak || Spacewatch || — || align=right | 3.4 km || 
|-id=916 bgcolor=#E9E9E9
| 159916 ||  || — || November 17, 2004 || Siding Spring || SSS || — || align=right | 1.8 km || 
|-id=917 bgcolor=#E9E9E9
| 159917 ||  || — || December 9, 2004 || Socorro || LINEAR || — || align=right | 1.8 km || 
|-id=918 bgcolor=#E9E9E9
| 159918 ||  || — || December 12, 2004 || Socorro || LINEAR || — || align=right | 1.9 km || 
|-id=919 bgcolor=#d6d6d6
| 159919 ||  || — || December 15, 2004 || Socorro || LINEAR || AEG || align=right | 6.6 km || 
|-id=920 bgcolor=#E9E9E9
| 159920 ||  || — || December 10, 2004 || Socorro || LINEAR || — || align=right | 3.2 km || 
|-id=921 bgcolor=#E9E9E9
| 159921 ||  || — || December 11, 2004 || Kitt Peak || Spacewatch || — || align=right | 3.8 km || 
|-id=922 bgcolor=#d6d6d6
| 159922 ||  || — || December 19, 2004 || Mount Lemmon || Mount Lemmon Survey || — || align=right | 4.5 km || 
|-id=923 bgcolor=#FFC2E0
| 159923 ||  || — || December 19, 2004 || Mount Lemmon || Mount Lemmon Survey || AMO +1km || align=right | 1.8 km || 
|-id=924 bgcolor=#fefefe
| 159924 ||  || — || December 16, 2004 || Kitt Peak || Spacewatch || — || align=right | 2.8 km || 
|-id=925 bgcolor=#E9E9E9
| 159925 ||  || — || January 11, 2005 || Socorro || LINEAR || AER || align=right | 2.6 km || 
|-id=926 bgcolor=#d6d6d6
| 159926 ||  || — || January 13, 2005 || Kitt Peak || Spacewatch || — || align=right | 4.1 km || 
|-id=927 bgcolor=#FA8072
| 159927 ||  || — || February 2, 2005 || Socorro || LINEAR || — || align=right | 2.6 km || 
|-id=928 bgcolor=#FFC2E0
| 159928 ||  || — || February 3, 2005 || Palomar || NEAT || APO +1km || align=right data-sort-value="0.90" | 900 m || 
|-id=929 bgcolor=#FFC2E0
| 159929 || 2005 UK || — || October 22, 2005 || Kitt Peak || Spacewatch || AMO +1km || align=right | 2.6 km || 
|-id=930 bgcolor=#fefefe
| 159930 ||  || — || October 25, 2005 || Mount Lemmon || Mount Lemmon Survey || H || align=right data-sort-value="0.89" | 890 m || 
|-id=931 bgcolor=#fefefe
| 159931 ||  || — || November 11, 2005 || Socorro || LINEAR || H || align=right data-sort-value="0.99" | 990 m || 
|-id=932 bgcolor=#fefefe
| 159932 ||  || — || November 3, 2005 || Socorro || LINEAR || — || align=right | 1.2 km || 
|-id=933 bgcolor=#E9E9E9
| 159933 ||  || — || November 2, 2005 || Socorro || LINEAR || JUN || align=right | 2.1 km || 
|-id=934 bgcolor=#E9E9E9
| 159934 ||  || — || November 21, 2005 || Catalina || CSS || — || align=right | 3.1 km || 
|-id=935 bgcolor=#d6d6d6
| 159935 ||  || — || November 26, 2005 || Catalina || CSS || — || align=right | 6.6 km || 
|-id=936 bgcolor=#fefefe
| 159936 ||  || — || November 21, 2005 || Kitt Peak || Spacewatch || — || align=right | 2.0 km || 
|-id=937 bgcolor=#d6d6d6
| 159937 ||  || — || November 26, 2005 || Mount Lemmon || Mount Lemmon Survey || SHU3:2 || align=right | 7.8 km || 
|-id=938 bgcolor=#fefefe
| 159938 ||  || — || November 29, 2005 || Socorro || LINEAR || MAS || align=right | 1.2 km || 
|-id=939 bgcolor=#fefefe
| 159939 ||  || — || November 28, 2005 || Catalina || CSS || FLO || align=right | 1.0 km || 
|-id=940 bgcolor=#fefefe
| 159940 ||  || — || November 30, 2005 || Socorro || LINEAR || FLO || align=right | 1.1 km || 
|-id=941 bgcolor=#fefefe
| 159941 ||  || — || November 25, 2005 || Catalina || CSS || FLO || align=right data-sort-value="0.84" | 840 m || 
|-id=942 bgcolor=#E9E9E9
| 159942 ||  || — || November 29, 2005 || Palomar || NEAT || ADE || align=right | 3.6 km || 
|-id=943 bgcolor=#fefefe
| 159943 ||  || — || December 1, 2005 || Kitt Peak || Spacewatch || — || align=right | 1.2 km || 
|-id=944 bgcolor=#E9E9E9
| 159944 ||  || — || December 1, 2005 || Kitt Peak || Spacewatch || — || align=right | 1.3 km || 
|-id=945 bgcolor=#fefefe
| 159945 ||  || — || December 5, 2005 || Mount Lemmon || Mount Lemmon Survey || — || align=right | 1.00 km || 
|-id=946 bgcolor=#fefefe
| 159946 ||  || — || December 22, 2005 || Kitt Peak || Spacewatch || FLO || align=right | 2.1 km || 
|-id=947 bgcolor=#fefefe
| 159947 ||  || — || December 21, 2005 || Catalina || CSS || H || align=right | 1.2 km || 
|-id=948 bgcolor=#E9E9E9
| 159948 ||  || — || December 25, 2005 || Kitt Peak || Spacewatch || — || align=right | 2.2 km || 
|-id=949 bgcolor=#fefefe
| 159949 ||  || — || December 24, 2005 || Kitt Peak || Spacewatch || — || align=right | 1.3 km || 
|-id=950 bgcolor=#E9E9E9
| 159950 ||  || — || December 26, 2005 || Mount Lemmon || Mount Lemmon Survey || — || align=right | 3.9 km || 
|-id=951 bgcolor=#E9E9E9
| 159951 ||  || — || December 27, 2005 || Kitt Peak || Spacewatch || — || align=right | 3.1 km || 
|-id=952 bgcolor=#d6d6d6
| 159952 ||  || — || December 25, 2005 || Kitt Peak || Spacewatch || — || align=right | 3.9 km || 
|-id=953 bgcolor=#E9E9E9
| 159953 ||  || — || December 27, 2005 || Mount Lemmon || Mount Lemmon Survey || — || align=right | 2.3 km || 
|-id=954 bgcolor=#E9E9E9
| 159954 ||  || — || December 25, 2005 || Mount Lemmon || Mount Lemmon Survey || — || align=right | 1.8 km || 
|-id=955 bgcolor=#fefefe
| 159955 ||  || — || December 27, 2005 || Socorro || LINEAR || — || align=right | 1.4 km || 
|-id=956 bgcolor=#d6d6d6
| 159956 ||  || — || December 29, 2005 || Catalina || CSS || — || align=right | 4.6 km || 
|-id=957 bgcolor=#fefefe
| 159957 ||  || — || December 26, 2005 || Mount Lemmon || Mount Lemmon Survey || — || align=right | 1.2 km || 
|-id=958 bgcolor=#fefefe
| 159958 ||  || — || December 25, 2005 || Mount Lemmon || Mount Lemmon Survey || — || align=right | 1.9 km || 
|-id=959 bgcolor=#d6d6d6
| 159959 ||  || — || January 4, 2006 || Catalina || CSS || — || align=right | 5.0 km || 
|-id=960 bgcolor=#E9E9E9
| 159960 ||  || — || January 5, 2006 || Mount Lemmon || Mount Lemmon Survey || MAR || align=right | 1.9 km || 
|-id=961 bgcolor=#E9E9E9
| 159961 ||  || — || January 5, 2006 || Anderson Mesa || LONEOS || — || align=right | 3.0 km || 
|-id=962 bgcolor=#d6d6d6
| 159962 ||  || — || January 7, 2006 || Mount Lemmon || Mount Lemmon Survey || EOS || align=right | 3.6 km || 
|-id=963 bgcolor=#E9E9E9
| 159963 ||  || — || January 7, 2006 || Mount Lemmon || Mount Lemmon Survey || — || align=right | 1.5 km || 
|-id=964 bgcolor=#E9E9E9
| 159964 ||  || — || January 20, 2006 || Kitt Peak || Spacewatch || ADE || align=right | 3.8 km || 
|-id=965 bgcolor=#d6d6d6
| 159965 ||  || — || January 21, 2006 || Mount Lemmon || Mount Lemmon Survey || — || align=right | 4.1 km || 
|-id=966 bgcolor=#d6d6d6
| 159966 ||  || — || January 22, 2006 || Anderson Mesa || LONEOS || HYG || align=right | 4.5 km || 
|-id=967 bgcolor=#d6d6d6
| 159967 ||  || — || January 21, 2006 || Kitt Peak || Spacewatch || KOR || align=right | 2.4 km || 
|-id=968 bgcolor=#d6d6d6
| 159968 ||  || — || January 23, 2006 || Mount Lemmon || Mount Lemmon Survey || — || align=right | 3.9 km || 
|-id=969 bgcolor=#d6d6d6
| 159969 ||  || — || January 22, 2006 || Catalina || CSS || URS || align=right | 6.0 km || 
|-id=970 bgcolor=#E9E9E9
| 159970 ||  || — || January 22, 2006 || Mount Lemmon || Mount Lemmon Survey || — || align=right | 1.8 km || 
|-id=971 bgcolor=#d6d6d6
| 159971 ||  || — || January 24, 2006 || Socorro || LINEAR || — || align=right | 3.7 km || 
|-id=972 bgcolor=#d6d6d6
| 159972 ||  || — || January 26, 2006 || Mount Lemmon || Mount Lemmon Survey || — || align=right | 4.4 km || 
|-id=973 bgcolor=#d6d6d6
| 159973 ||  || — || January 26, 2006 || Kitt Peak || Spacewatch || KOR || align=right | 2.2 km || 
|-id=974 bgcolor=#fefefe
| 159974 Badacsony ||  ||  || January 24, 2006 || Piszkéstető || K. Sárneczky || NYS || align=right data-sort-value="0.78" | 780 m || 
|-id=975 bgcolor=#E9E9E9
| 159975 ||  || — || January 22, 2006 || Catalina || CSS || — || align=right | 4.8 km || 
|-id=976 bgcolor=#E9E9E9
| 159976 ||  || — || January 25, 2006 || Kitt Peak || Spacewatch || HEN || align=right | 1.7 km || 
|-id=977 bgcolor=#d6d6d6
| 159977 ||  || — || January 26, 2006 || Mount Lemmon || Mount Lemmon Survey || — || align=right | 3.9 km || 
|-id=978 bgcolor=#E9E9E9
| 159978 ||  || — || January 26, 2006 || Kitt Peak || Spacewatch || — || align=right | 2.9 km || 
|-id=979 bgcolor=#fefefe
| 159979 ||  || — || January 27, 2006 || Kitt Peak || Spacewatch || V || align=right | 1.0 km || 
|-id=980 bgcolor=#fefefe
| 159980 ||  || — || January 27, 2006 || Mount Lemmon || Mount Lemmon Survey || — || align=right | 1.1 km || 
|-id=981 bgcolor=#d6d6d6
| 159981 ||  || — || January 31, 2006 || Kitt Peak || Spacewatch || — || align=right | 3.7 km || 
|-id=982 bgcolor=#E9E9E9
| 159982 ||  || — || January 31, 2006 || Catalina || CSS || — || align=right | 3.5 km || 
|-id=983 bgcolor=#fefefe
| 159983 ||  || — || January 31, 2006 || Kitt Peak || Spacewatch || NYS || align=right | 1.1 km || 
|-id=984 bgcolor=#d6d6d6
| 159984 ||  || — || February 1, 2006 || Kitt Peak || Spacewatch || — || align=right | 4.3 km || 
|-id=985 bgcolor=#E9E9E9
| 159985 ||  || — || February 2, 2006 || Kitt Peak || Spacewatch || WIT || align=right | 1.7 km || 
|-id=986 bgcolor=#d6d6d6
| 159986 ||  || — || February 4, 2006 || Kitt Peak || Spacewatch || THM || align=right | 3.3 km || 
|-id=987 bgcolor=#fefefe
| 159987 ||  || — || February 4, 2006 || Mount Lemmon || Mount Lemmon Survey || NYS || align=right | 1.3 km || 
|-id=988 bgcolor=#E9E9E9
| 159988 ||  || — || February 20, 2006 || Catalina || CSS || PAE || align=right | 5.0 km || 
|-id=989 bgcolor=#fefefe
| 159989 ||  || — || February 20, 2006 || Kitt Peak || Spacewatch || V || align=right | 1.3 km || 
|-id=990 bgcolor=#d6d6d6
| 159990 ||  || — || February 21, 2006 || Catalina || CSS || 7:4 || align=right | 6.4 km || 
|-id=991 bgcolor=#E9E9E9
| 159991 ||  || — || February 22, 2006 || Catalina || CSS || — || align=right | 2.9 km || 
|-id=992 bgcolor=#d6d6d6
| 159992 ||  || — || February 27, 2006 || Catalina || CSS || URS || align=right | 6.2 km || 
|-id=993 bgcolor=#d6d6d6
| 159993 ||  || — || February 27, 2006 || Kitt Peak || Spacewatch || THM || align=right | 3.3 km || 
|-id=994 bgcolor=#d6d6d6
| 159994 ||  || — || February 25, 2006 || Kitt Peak || Spacewatch || — || align=right | 3.5 km || 
|-id=995 bgcolor=#d6d6d6
| 159995 ||  || — || February 27, 2006 || Kitt Peak || Spacewatch || — || align=right | 6.0 km || 
|-id=996 bgcolor=#d6d6d6
| 159996 ||  || — || February 25, 2006 || Anderson Mesa || LONEOS || — || align=right | 8.7 km || 
|-id=997 bgcolor=#d6d6d6
| 159997 ||  || — || February 24, 2006 || Kitt Peak || Spacewatch || — || align=right | 3.0 km || 
|-id=998 bgcolor=#E9E9E9
| 159998 ||  || — || March 2, 2006 || Mount Lemmon || Mount Lemmon Survey || — || align=right | 1.7 km || 
|-id=999 bgcolor=#d6d6d6
| 159999 Michaelgriffin ||  ||  || March 2, 2006 || Kitt Peak || M. W. Buie || — || align=right | 2.6 km || 
|-id=000 bgcolor=#d6d6d6
| 160000 Lemmon ||  ||  || April 2, 2006 || Mount Lemmon || Mount Lemmon Survey || EMA || align=right | 4.9 km || 
|}

References

External links 
 Discovery Circumstances: Numbered Minor Planets (155001)–(160000) (IAU Minor Planet Center)

0159